This is a list of ships of the line of the Royal Navy of England, and later (from 1707) of Great Britain, and the United Kingdom.  The list starts from 1660, the year in which the Royal Navy came into being after the restoration of the monarchy under Charles II, up until the emergence of the battleship around 1880, as defined by the Admiralty.

The early Restoration period (1660–77)
This list includes several earlier ships which were rebuilt for the Royal Navy in this period—specifically the first-rate Prince Royal (in 1663), the second-rate Victory (in 1666), the third-rate Montague (in 1675) and the fourth-rates Bonaventure (in 1663) and Constant Warwick (in 1666). The process, which generally involved the dismantling in dry dock of the old ship and constructing it to a new design incorporating part of the materials from the old vessel, produced what were in effect substantially new ships with altered dimensions and sizes, and generally mounting a somewhat larger number of guns.

First rates
 Prince Royal 92 (rebuilt 1663) – taken and burnt by the Dutch 1666

96-gun group
 Charles 96 (1668) – renamed St George 1687, re-classed as second rate 1691, rebuilt 1701
 St Andrew 96 (1670) – renamed Royal Anne when rebuilt 1704
 London 96 (1670) – broken up 1701

100-gun group
 Prince 100 (1670) – repaired and renamed Royal William 1692, rebuilt 1719
 Royal James 100 (1671) – burned in action 1672
 Royal Charles 100 (1673) – repaired and renamed Queen 1693, rebuilt and renamed Royal George in 1715
 Royal James 100 (1675) – renamed Victory 1691, then Royal George 1714, then Victory again in 1715; burnt by accident 1721

Second rates
 Royal Katherine 76 (1664) – rebuilt from 1699 to 1703
 Royal Oak 76 (1664) – burned by the Dutch on 14 June 1667
 Loyal London 80 (1666) – burned by the Dutch on 14 June 1667
 Victory 76 (Rebuilt 1666) – condemned and broken up 1691
 French Ruby 66 (1666) – a prize, Le Rubis, captured from the French, hulked January 1686 at Portsmouth after storm damage and broken up
 St Michael 90 (1669) – re-classed as a first rate 1672, then back to a second rate 1689; renamed Marlborough in 1706 and rebuilt 1706 to 1708

Third rates
 Clove Tree 62 (1665) – a prize, formerly VOC ship Nagelboom, captured from the Dutch, retaken by them 1666
 House of Sweeds 70 (1665) – formerly Huis te Zwieten, a prize captured from the Dutch, sunk as a blockship in the Thames 1667
 Golden Phoenix 70 (1665) – formerly Geldersche Ruyter, a prize captured from the Dutch, sunk as a blockship in the Thames 1667
 Slothany 60 (1665) – formerly Slot Hooningen, a prize captured from the Dutch, hulked 1667, sold 1686
 Helverson 60 (1665) – formerly Hilversum, a prize captured from the Dutch in June 1665, sunk as a blockship in the Medway 1667
 Cambridge 64 (1666) – wrecked 1694
 Warspite 64 (1666) – rebuilt 1702
 Defiance 64 (1666) – burned by accident 1668
 Rupert 64 (1666) – rebuilt 1703
 Resolution 64 (1667) – rebuilt 1698
 Monmouth 64 (1667) – rebuilt 1700
 Edgar 72 (1668) – rebuilt 1700
 Swiftsure 66 (1673) – rebuilt 1696
 Harwich 66 (1674) – wrecked 1691
 Royal Oak 70 (1674) – rebuilt 1713
 Defiance 64 (1675) – rebuilt 1695
 Arms of Rotterdam 60 (1674) – a prize captured from the Dutch, hulked 1675, broken up 1703
 Montague 62 – built as Lyme in 1654, rebuilt as Montague in 1675 and again rebuilt in 1698

Fourth rates
  42 – rebuilt as in 1666, captured by the French 1691
1646 Programme Group

1647 Programme Group

1649 Programme Group

1650 Programme Group

1651 Programme Group

Ruby Group

 Bonaventure 48  – previously named HMS President.  Renamed HMS Bonaventure in 1660, rebuilt in 1666 and broken up for a rebuild in 1711.  Re-launched in 1711 as a 50-gun fourth rate.  Renamed Argyll in 1715, rebuilt in 1722 and sunk as a breakwater in 1748
 West Friesland 54 (1665) – a prize, Westfriesland, captured from the Dutch, sold 1667
 Seven Oaks 52 (1665) – a prize, Zevenwolden, captured from the Dutch, retaken by them 1666
 Charles V 52 (1665) – a prize, Carolus Quintus, captured from the Dutch, burned by them 1667
 Guilder de Ruyter 50 (1665) – a prize, Geldersche Ruiter, captured from the Dutch, sold 1667
 Maria Sancta 50 (1665) – a prize, Sint Marie, captured from the Dutch, burned by them 1667
 Mars 50 (1665) – a prize, Mars, captured from the Dutch, sold 1667
 Delft 48 (1665) – a prize, Delft, captured from the Dutch, sold 1668
 St Paul 48 (1665) – a prize, Sint Paulus, captured from the Dutch, burned in action 1666
 Hope 44 (1665) – a prize, Hoop, captured from the Dutch, wrecked 1666
 Black Spread Eagle 44 (1665) – a prize, Groningen, captured from the Dutch, sunk in action 1666.
 Golden Lion 42 (1665) – a prize, Gouden Leeuw, captured from the Dutch, given to Guinea Company 1668
 Zealand 42 (1665) – a prize, Zeelandia, captured from the Dutch, sold 1667
 Unity 42 (1665) – a prize, Eendracht, captured from the Dutch, retaken by them 1667
 Young Prince 38 (1665) – a prize, Jonge Prins, captured from the Dutch, expended as a fireship 1666
 Black Bull 36 (1665) – a prize, Edam, captured from the Dutch, retaken and sunk by them 1666
 St Patrick 48 (1666) – captured by the Dutch 1667
 Greenwich 54 (1666) – rebuilt 1699
 St David 54 (1667) – sunk at Portsmouth 1690, raised but sold 1713
 Stathouse van Harlem 46 (1667) – a prize, Raadhuis van Haarlem, captured from the Dutch, sunk as a breakwater at Sheerness 1690
 Stavoreen 48 (1672) – a prize captured from the Dutch, sold 1682
 Arms of Terver 48 (1673) – a prize captured from the Dutch, sold 1682
 Oxford 54 (1674) – rebuilt 1702.
 Woolwich 54 (1675) – rebuilt 1702
 Kingfisher 46 (1675) – a specialised fourth-rate designed for a role similar to that of the Q-ships of 1914–18, rather than for the battle fleet; rebuilt 1699
The above list excludes two smaller fourth-rates not designed for the line of battle—the galley-frigates Charles Galley and James Galley of 1676. It also excludes four fifth-rates of 36 guns (the Falcon and Sweepstakes of 1666, the Nonsuch of 1668, and the Phoenix of 1671) which were re-classed as 42-gun fourth rates some years after their original completion, but later reverted to being fifth-rates.

The "Thirty Ships" programme of 1677 (1677–88)
 First rate of 100 guns
 Britannia 100 (28 June 1682) – broken up 1715
 Second rates of 90 guns
 Vanguard 90 (November 1678) – wrecked in the Great Storm of 1703
 Windsor Castle 90 (4 March 1679) – wrecked 1693
 Sandwich 90 (May 1679) – rebuilt 1709–1715; lazarette 1752, broken up 1770
 Duchess 90 (May 1679) – renamed Princess Anne 31 December 1701, renamed Windsor Castle 17 March 1702, renamed Blenheim 18 December 1706; rebuilt 1708–09; broken up 1763.
 Albemarle 90 (29 October 1680) – rebuilt 1701–04; renamed Union 29 December 1709, broken up 1749
 Neptune 90 (17 April 1683) – rebuilt 1708–10
 Duke 90 (13 June 1682) – rebuilt 1700–01 and renamed Prince George 31 December 1701; broken up to rebuild 1719
 Ossory 90 (24 August 1682) – rebuilt 1708–11 and renamed Princess 2 January 1716, then Princess Royal 26 July 1728
 Coronation 90 (23 May 1685) – wrecked 1691
 Third rates of 70 guns
 Lenox 70 (1678)
 Hampton Court 70 (1678)
 Anne 70 (1678) – Burnt 1690
 Captain 70 (1678)
 Restoration 70 (1678) – wrecked in the Great Storm of 1703
 Berwick 70 (1679)
 Burford 70 (1679)
 Eagle 70 (1679)
 Expedition 70 (1679) – renamed Prince Frederick 1715, sold 1784
 Grafton 70 (1679)
 Pendennis 70 (1679) – wrecked 1689
 Northumberland 70 (1679) – wrecked in the Great Storm of 1703
 Essex 70 (1679) – broken up 1736 for rebuild
 Kent 70 (1679)
 Exeter 70 (1680) – hulked 1691
 Suffolk 70 (1680) – broken up by 1765
 Hope 70 (1678) – captured 1695
 Elizabeth 70 (1679) – rebuilt 1703
 Stirling Castle 70 (1679) – wrecked in the Great Storm of 1703
 Breda 70 (c. 1679) – burnt 1690

New fourth rates (1683–88)
 Mordaunt 46 (c. 1681) – built privately and purchased 1683. wrecked 1693
 Deptford 50 (1687) – broken up 1700 for rebuild
 St Albans 50 (1687) – wrecked 1693
 Sedgemoor 50 (1687) – wrecked 1689

Major rebuilds (1677–88)
 Royal Sovereign (first rate) 100 (1685) – burnt by accident 29 January 1696
 Mary (third rate) 60 (1688) – wrecked in Great Storm 27 November 1703
 Tiger (fourth rate) 44 (1681) – rebuilt 1701–03
 Bonaventure (fourth rate) 48 (1683) – rebuilt 1699
 Hampshire (fourth rate) 46 (1686) – sunk in action 26 August 1697
 Assistance (fourth rate) 48 (1687) – rebuilt 1699
 Ruby (fourth rate) 48 (1687) – rebuilt 1704–06

Captures – ex-Algerines
 The Royal Navy took into service as fourth rates the following ships captured from the Algerines (Algerian corsairs)
 Marigold 44 (ex-Algerine Marygold, captured 28 October 1677) – wrecked 1679
 Tiger Prize 48 (ex-Algerine, captured 1 April 1678) – sunk as a breakwater 1696
 Golden Horse 46 (ex-Algerine Golden Horse, captured 9 April 1681) – sunk as a breakwater 1688
 Half Moon 44 (ex-Algerine Half Moon, captured 9 September 1681) – burnt by accident 1686
 Two Lions 44 (ex-Algerine Two Lions, captured 16 September 1681) – sold 1688

List of ships-of-the-line of the Royal Navy (1688–97)
Number of main guns follows name (see rating system of the Royal Navy)
Except where stated otherwise, these ships are listed in the order of pp. 163–165 The Ship of the Line Volume I, by Brian Lavery, pub Conways, 1983,

The "Twenty-Seven Ships" programme of 1691
This programme was approved by Parliament on 10 October 1690. While nominally it comprised 17 third rates of 80 guns and ten fourth rates of 60 guns, funds for three third rates of 70 guns were provided at virtually the same date as the Programme, which should thus strictly speaking refer to Thirty Ships.
 Two-decker third rates of 80 guns
 Devonshire 80 (1692) – blew up at the Battle at The Lizard, 1707
 Cornwall 80 (1692)
 Boyne 80 (1692) – broken up by 1763
 Russell 80 (1692)
 Norfolk 80 (1693)
 Humber 80 (1693)
 Sussex 80 (1693) – wrecked 1694
 Torbay 80 (1693)
 Lancaster 80 (1694)
 Dorsetshire 80 (1694)
 Cambridge 80 (1695)
 Chichester 80 (1695)
 Newark 80 (1695)
 Three-decker third rates of 80 guns.
These four were originally intended to be two-deckers, like the other 13, but were completed as three-deckers.
 Shrewsbury 80 (1695)
 Cumberland 80 (1695) – captured by France at the Battle at The Lizard, 1707, to Genoa 1715, to Spain 1717 as Principe de Asturias 70, captured by Britain at the Battle of Cape Passaro, 1718, to Austria 1720 as San Carlos, broken up 1733
 Ranelagh 80 (1697) – renamed Princess Caroline 1728
 Somerset 80 (1698) – broken up 1740
 Third rates of 70 guns
 Bredah 70 (1692) – broken up 1730
 Ipswich 70 (1693) – broken up 1727 to rebuild
 Yarmouth 70 (1695) – broken up 1707 and rebuilt 1707–09; hulked 1740, sold or broken up 1769
 Fourth rates of 60 guns
 Medway 60 (1693)
 Carlisle 60 (1693) – wrecked 1696
 Winchester 60 (1693) – sank 1695
 Canterbury 60 (1693)
 Sunderland 60 (1694) – scuttled 1737
 Pembroke 60 (1694) – captured 1709
 Gloucester 60 (1695) – broken up 1731
 Windsor 60 (1695)
 Kingston 60 (1697)
 Exeter 60 (1697)

Other third rates
 70-gun ships, ordered 1695
 Bedford 70 (1698) – rebuilt 1741
 Orford 70 (1698) – rebuilt 1712
 Nassau 70 (1699) – wrecked 1706
 Revenge 70 (1699) – renamed Buckingham 1711, hulk 1727, scuttled as a foundation 1745
 64-gun ship
 Dreadnought 64 (1691) – reduced to fourth rate 1697, rebuilt 1706

Second rates of 90 guns, ordered 1695
 Association 90 (1697) – wrecked 1707
 Barfleur 90 (1697) – rebuilt 1716 at 80-gun ship
 Namur 90 (1697) – rebuilt 1729
 Triumph 90 (1698) – renamed Prince 1714, rebuilt 1750

Fourth rates of 50 guns
The split between 123 ft groups and 130 ft groups is not in Lavery, but in the previous version of this list on Wikipedia.  However the split is supported by data in The 50-Gun Ship and in British Warships in the Age of Sail 1603–1714.
 Ordered 1690–92 (123 ft group)
 Chatham (1691) – broken up 1718 for rebuild
 Centurion (1691) – broken up 1728 for rebuild
 Chester (1691) – captured by France at the Battle at The Lizard, 1707
 Norwich (1691) – wrecked 1692
 Weymouth (1693) – broken up 1717 for rebuild
 Falmouth (1693) – captured by France 1704
 Rochester (1693) – broken up 1714 for rebuild
 Portland (1693) – broken up 1719 for rebuild
 Southampton (1693) – broken up 1699 for rebuild
 Norwich (1693) – broken up 1712 for rebuild
 Dartmouth (1693) – captured by France 1695, recaptured 1702, renamed Vigo, wrecked 1703
 Anglesea (1694) – broken up 1719
 Ordered 1693 (130 ft group)
 Colchester (1694) – wrecked 1704
 Romney (1695) – wrecked 1707
 Lichfield (1695) – broken up 1720 for rebuild
 Lincoln (1695) – sank 1703
 Coventry (1695) – captured by France 1704, recaptured 1709
 Severn (1695) – broken up 1734 for rebuild
 Burlington (1695) – broken up 1733
 Ordered 1694 (130 ft group)
 Harwich (1695) – wrecked 1700
 Pendennis (1695) – captured by France 1705
 Ordered 1695 (130 ft group)
 Blackwall (1696) – captured by France 1705
 Guernsey (1696) – broken up 1716 for rebuild
 Nonsuch (1696) – broken up 1716 for rebuild
 Warwick (1696) – broken up 1709 for rebuild
 Hampshire 50 (1698) – broken up 1739
 Winchester 50 (1698) – broken up 1716 for rebuild
 Salisbury 50 (1698) – captured by France 1703, recaptured 1708, renamed Salisbury Prize, renamed Preston 1716, broken up 1739 for rebuild
 Worcester 50 (1698) – broken up 1713 for rebuild
 Dartmouth 42 (1698) – broken up 1714 for rebuild
 Jersey 50 (1698) – hulked 1731, sunk 1763
 Carlisle 50 (1698) – blew up 1700
 Tilbury 50 (1699) – broken up 1726 for rebuild
 Other 50-Gun Ships (purchased)
 Falkland (c. 1690) – built by Holland at Newcastle, New England and purchased 1696, rebuilt 1702

Major rebuilds
 First rates
 Royal William 100 (1692) – ex-Prince, rebuilt 1719
 Queen 100 (1693) – ex-Royal Charles, rebuilt 1715, renamed Royal George
 Victory 100 (1695) – ex-Royal James, burnt 1721 and broken up
 Third rates
 Royal Oak 74 (1690) – rebuilt 1713
 Defiance 64 (1695) – rebuilt 1707
 Swiftsure 66 (1696) – rebuilt 1716 and renamed Revenge
 Fourth rates
 Crown 46 (1689) – rebuilt 1703–04
 Dragon 46 (1690) – rebuilt 1706–07
 Newcastle 52 (1692) – foundered during Great Storm of 1703
 Bristol 50 (1693) – captured 1709
 Dover 50 (1695) – rebuilt 1716

Captured ships, War of 1689–1697
 Content 70 (1686) – ex-French captured 29 January 1695, hulk 1703, sold 1715
 Ruby Prize 48 (1695) – ex-French captured 1695, sold 1698
 Trident 58 (1695) – ex-French, captured 29 January 1695, scuttled as breakwater 1701
 Medway Prize 50 (1697) – ex-French privateer, captured 30 April 1697 and then purchased for the Navy 20 August 1697, hulk 1699, scuttled as a foundation 1712

List of ships-of-the-line of the Royal Navy (1697–1719)
Number of main guns follows name (see rating system of the Royal Navy)
Except where stated otherwise, these ships are listed in the order of pp. 165–169 The Ship of the Line Volume I, by Brian Lavery, pub Conways, 1983,

First rates of 100 guns, rebuilt 1697–1719
 Royal Sovereign 100 (1701) – broken up 1768
 Royal Anne 100 (1703) – ex-St Andrew, broken up 1757
 London 100 (1706) – enlarged 1721 to 1,711 tons, broken up 1747
 Royal George 100 (1715) – ex-Queen, renamed Royal Anne 1756, broken up 1767
 Britannia 100 (1719) – harbour service 1745, broken up 1749
 Royal William 100 (1719) – reduced to 84 guns, broken up 1813

New ships, pre-Establishment, 1697–1706
 Third rates of 70 guns
 Northumberland 70 (1705) – rebuilt 1721
 Stirling Castle 70 (1705) – rebuilt 1723
 Resolution 70 (1705) – ran aground 1707
 Nassau 70 (1707) – rebuilt 1740
 Elizabeth 70 (1706) – rebuilt 1737
 Restoration 70 (1706) – wrecked 1711
 Fourth rates of 60 guns
 Nottingham 60 (1703) – rebuilt 1719
 Mary 60 (1704) – rebuilt 1742 and renamed Princess Mary
 York 60 (1706) – lengthened 1738, sunk as a breakwater 1750
 Fourth rates of 50 guns, 130 ft group
 Swallow 50 (1703) – rebuilt 1719
 Antelope 50 (1703) – rebuilt 1741
 Leopard 50 (1703) – rebuilt 1721
 Panther 50 (1703) – rebuilt 1716
 Newcastle 50 (1704) – rebuilt 1732
 Reserve 50 (1704) – renamed Sutherland 1716, hospital ship 1741, broken up 1754
 Saint Albans 50 (1706) – rebuilt 1737
 Colchester 50 (1707) – rebuilt 1721

Rebuilds, pre-Establishment, 1697–1706
 Second rates of 90 guns
 Prince George 90 (1701) – ex-Duke, rebuilt 1723
 St George 90 (1701) – ex-Charles, rebuilt 1740
 Royal Katherine 90 (1702) – renamed Ramillies 1706, rebuilt 1749
 Union 90 (1704) – ex-Albemarle, rebuilt 1726
 Third rates of 80 guns
 Devonshire 80 (1704) – blown up in action 1707
 Chichester 80 (1706) – broken up 1749
 Cornwall 80 (1706) – rebuilt 1726
 Third rates of 70 guns
 Resolution 70 (1698) – foundered 1703
 Burford 70 (1699) – wrecked 1719
 Eagle 70 (1699) – wrecked 1707
 Expedition 70 (1699) – rebuilt 1714 and renamed Prince Frederick
 Kent 70 (1699) – rebuilt 1724
 Stirling Castle 70 (1699) – wrecked 1703
 Suffolk 70 (1699) – rebuilt 1719
 Berwick 70 (1700) – hulked 1715, broken up 1723
 Edgar 70 (1700) – rebuilt 1709
 Essex 70 (1700) – rebuilt 1713
 Grafton 70 (1700) – captured 1707
 Hampton Court 70 (1701) – captured 1707
 Lenox 70 (1701) – rebuilt 1723
 Northumberland 70 (1702) – wrecked 1703
 Restoration 70 (1702) – wrecked 1703
 Elizabeth 70 (1704) – captured 1704
 Third rates of 66 guns
 Monmouth 66 (1700) – rebuilt 1718
 Warspite 66 (1702) – renamed Edinburgh, rebuilt 1721
 Rupert 66 (1703) – rebuild of 1666 Rupert to different design, reduced to fourth rate 1716, broken up 1736 (then rebuilt again from 1737 to 1740)
 Defiance 66 (1707) – reduced to fourth rate 1716, hulk 1743, broken up 1749
 Fourth rates of 60 guns
 Montague 60 (1698) – rebuilt 1716
 Monck 60 (1702) – wrecked 1720
 Dunkirk 60 (1704) – rebuilt 1734
 Plymouth 60 (1705) – foundered 1705
 Dreadnought 60 (1706) – enlarged 1722, hulked 1740, broken up 1748
 Fourth rates of 46–54 guns
 Advice (1698) – captured 1711
  (1699) – rebuilt 1712
 Bonaventure (1699) – rebuilt 1711
 Greenwich (1699) – rebuilt 1730
  (1699) – hulked 1706, broken up 1728
   (1700) – rebuilt 1719
 Southampton (1700) – hulked 1728, broken up 1771
  (1701) – foundered 1703
 Tiger (1702) – rebuilt 1722
 Falkland (1702) – rebuilt 1720
  (1704) – wrecked 1719
  (1706) – captured 1707

1706 Establishment
The 1706 Establishment established a desired set of principal dimensions for each group (i.e. size) of warship from the 40-gun fifth rate up to the 90-gun second rate (first rates and ships of less than 40 guns were not covered by the 1706 Establishment). As only the principal dimensions were specified, the design of individual ships remained with the Master Shipwright in each Dockyard; thus ships of the same number of guns built to this Establishment did not constitute a class in the modern sense of all being built to one design.
 Second rates of 90 guns
The seven Second rates of this Establishment were ordered as 96-gun vessels under the ordnance specification of the 1703 Guns Establishment, but the subsequent 1716 Guns Establishment reduced this armament to 90 guns.
 Marlborough 90 (1706) – ex-St Michael, rebuilt 1732
 Blenheim 90 (1709) – ex-Duchess, broken up 1763
 Neptune 90 (1710) – rebuilt 1730
 Vanguard 90 (1710) – rebuilt 1739 and renamed Duke
 Princess 90 (1711) – ex-Ossory, renamed Princess Royal 1728, broken up 1773
 Sandwich 90 (1712) – broken up 1770
 Barfleur 90 (1716) – hulked 1764, broken up 1783
 Third rates of 80 guns
The ten three-decker third rates of this Establishment were ordered as 80-gun vessels under the ordnance specification of the 1703 Guns Establishment, while the subsequent 1716 Guns Establishment retained this total (while making slight adjustments).
 Boyne 80 (1708) – rebuilt 1739
 Humber 80 (1708) – rebuilt 1726 and renamed Princess Amelia
 Russell 80 (1709) – rebuilt 1735
 Cumberland 80 (1710) – broken up 1731 and rebuilt 1739
 Devonshire 80 (1710) – hulk 1740, sold 1760
 Dorsetshire 80 (1712) – sold 1749
 Shrewsbury 80 (1713) – broken up 1749
 Cambridge 80 (1715) – broken up 1749
 Torbay 80 (1719) – broken up 1749
 Newark 80 (1717) – rebuilt 1747
 Third rates of 70 guns
 Resolution 70 (1708) – wrecked 1711
 Captain 70 (1708) – rebuilt 1722
 Grafton 70 (1709) – rebuilt 1725
 Hampton Court 70 (1709) – rebuilt 1744
 Edgar 70 (1709) – burnt 1711
 Yarmouth 70 (1709) – hulked 1740
 Orford 70 (1713) – rebuilt 1727
 Royal Oak 70 (1713) – rebuilt 1741
 Expedition 70 (1714) – renamed Prince Frederick 1715, rebuilt 1740
 Monmouth 70 (1718) – rebuilt 1742
 Revenge 70 (1718) – rebuilt 1742
 Suffolk 70 (1718) – rebuilt 1739
 Fourth rates of 60 guns
 Plymouth 60 (1708) – rebuilt 1722
 Lion 60 (1709) – rebuilt 1738
 Gloucester 60 (1709) – captured 1709
 Rippon 60 (1712) – rebuilt 1735
 Montague 60 (1716) – broken up 1749
 Medway 60 (1718) – hulk 1740, broken up 1749
 Kingston 60 (1719) – rebuilt 1740
 Nottingham 60 (1719) – rebuilt 1745
 Fourth rates of 50 guns
The first nineteen of the following vessels were ordered between 1706 and 1714 as 54-gun vessels, armed under the 1703 Guns Establishment with a main battery of 12-pounder guns. Under the 1716 Guns Establishment, the 54-gun ship was superseded by a 50-gun ship with a main battery of 18-pounder guns. The last ten ships listed below were ordered from 1715 onward which were established and armed to the 1716 Guns Establishment, and the existing 54-gun ships were re-armed to this standard as each came into a dockyard for refitting and opportunity allowed.
 Salisbury 50 (1707) – rebuilt 1717
 Dragon 50 (1707) – wrecked 1712
 Falmouth 50 (1708) – rebuilt 1729
 Pembroke 50 (1710) – broken up 1726
 Ruby 50 (1708) – renamed Mermaid and reduced to 44-gun fifth rate May 1744, sold 1748
 Chester 50 (1708) – harbour service 1743, broken up 1749
 Romney 50 (1708) – rebuilt 1726
 Bonaventure 50 (1711) – renamed Argyll 1715, rebuilt 1722
 Bristol 50 (1711) – broken up 1742, rebuilt 1746
 Warwick 50 (1711) – broken up 1726
 Ormonde 50 (1711) – renamed Dragon 1715, broken up 1733 for rebuild
 Assistance 50 (1713) – rebuilt 1725
 Gloucester 50 (1711) – rebuilt 1737
 Advice 50 (1712) – renamed Milford and reduced to 44-gun fifth rate 1744, sold 1749
 Strafford 50 (1714) – broken up 1733
 Worcester 50 (1714) – broken up 1733
 Panther 50 (1716) – hulked 1743, sold 1768
 Dartmouth 50 (1716) – rebuilt 1741
 Rochester 50 (1716) – renamed Maidstone hospital ship 1744, broken up 1748
 Nonsuch 50 (1717) – hulked 1740, broken up 1745
 Salisbury 50 (1717) – rebuilt 1726
 Winchester 50 (1717) – hulked 1744, broken up 1781
 St Albans 50 (1718) – broken up 1734
 Guernsey 50 (1717) – rebuilt 1740
 Norwich 50 (1718) – renamed Enterprise and reduced to 44-gun fifth rate 1744, broken up 1771
 Deptford 50 (1719) – sold 1725
 Tiger 50 (1722) – wrecked 1742
 Weymouth 50 (1719) – broken up 1732
 Swallow 50 (1719) – broken up 1728
 Fifth rates of 40–44 guns
These small two-decker warships were not ships of the line as they were not powerful enough to stand in the line of battle. They were informally described as frigates and are included in the article on that topic.

Captured ships, War of Spanish Succession
 Prompt Prize 80 (third rate) (1692, ex-French Prompt 76, captured 12 October 1702), sunk as a wharf 1703
 Assurance 70 (third rate) (1697, ex-French Assuré 66, captured 12 October 1702), broken up 1712
 Ferme 70 (third rate) (1700, ex-French Ferme, captured 12 October 1702), sold 1713
 Moderate 64 (fourth rate) (1685, ex-French Modéré, captured 12 October 1702), sold 1713
 Triton 42 (fifth rate, i.e. not a ship of the line) (1697, ex-French Triton, captured 12 October 1702) – sold 1709
 Hazardous 54 (fourth rate) (1701, ex-French Hasardeux, captured 14 November 1703) – wrecked 19 November 1706
 Falkland Prize 54 (fourth rate) (1698, ex-French flûte Seine, captured 15 July 1704) – wrecked 1705 and sold 1706
 Arrogant 60 (fourth rate) (1685, ex-French Arrogant, captured 20 March 1705), foundered 1709
 August 60 (fourth rate) (1704, ex-French Auguste, captured 8 August 1705), wrecked 1716
 Superb 64 (fourth rate) (1708, ex-French Superbe, captured 29 July 1710), broken up 1732
 Moor 54 (fourth rate) (1688, ex-French Maure, captured 13 December 1710, scuttled as a breakwater 1716

List of ships-of-the-line of the Royal Navy (1719–41)
Number of main guns follows name (see rating system of the Royal Navy)
Except where stated otherwise, these ships are listed in the order of pp. 169–171 The Ship of the Line Volume I, by Brian Lavery, pub Conways, 1983,

1719 Establishment
 First rates of 100 guns
 Royal Sovereign 100 (1728) – broken up 1768
 Second rates of 90 guns
 Prince George 90 (1723) – Burnt by accident 1768
 Union 90 (1726) – broken up 1749
 Namur 90 (1729) – reduced to 74 guns 1745, wrecked 1749
 Neptune 90 (1730) – renamed Torbay and reduced to 74 guns 1750, sold 1784
 Marlborough 90 (1732) – reduced to 68 guns 1752, foundered 1762
 Third rates of 80 guns
 Lancaster 80 (1722) – rebuilt 1749
 Princess Amelia 80 (1723) – ex-Humber, broken up 1752
 Cornwall 80 (1726) – broken up 1761
 Norfolk 80 (1728) – renamed Princess Amelia  1755, broken up 1757
 Somerset 80 (1731) – broken up 1746
 Princess Caroline 80 (1731) – ex-Ranelagh, broken up 1764
 Russell 80 (1735) – sunk as a breakwater 1762
 Third rates of 70 guns
 Edinburgh 70 (1721) – ex-Warspite, rebuilt 1744
 Northumberland 70 (1721) – rebuilt 1743
 Burford 70 (1722) – broken up 1752
 Captain 70 (1722) – hulked 1739, broken up 1762
 Stirling Castle 70 (1723) – hulked 1739, broken up 1771
 Berwick 70 (1723) – hulked 1743, broken up 1763
 Lenox 70 (1723) – sunk as a breakwater 1756
 Kent 70 (1724) – broken up 1744
 Grafton 70 (1725) – broken up 1744
 Ipswich 70 (1730) – hulked 1757, broken up 1764
 Buckingham 70 (1731) – broken up 1745
 Prince of Orange 70 (1734) – reduced to 60 guns 1748, sheer hulk 1772, sold 1810
 Fourth rates of 60 guns
 Canterbury 60 (1722) – rebuilt 1744
 Plymouth 60 (1722) – broken up 1764
 Sunderland 60 (1724) – rebuilt 1744
 Windsor 60 (1729) – rebuilt 1745
 Deptford 60 (1732) – reduced to 50 guns 1752, sold 1767
 Swallow 60 (1732) – broken up 1742
 Tilbury 60 (1733) – burnt 1742
 Warwick 60 (1733) – captured 1756
 Pembroke 60 (1733) – wrecked 1749
 Dunkirk 60 (1734) – wrecked 1749
 Fourth rates of 50 guns
 Falkland 50 (1720) – rebuilt 1744
 Chatham 50 (1721) – sunk as a breakwater 1749
 Colchester 50 (1721) – broken up 1742
 Leopard 50 (1721) – broken up 1739
 Argyll 50 (1722) – sunk as a breakwater 1748
 Portland 50 (1723) – broken up 1743
 Assistance 50 (1725) – sunk as a breakwater 1745
 Romney 50 (1726) – sold 1757
 Salisbury 50 (1726) – hulked 1744, sold 1749
 Oxford 50 (1727) – broken up 1758
 Falmouth 50 (1729) – broken up 1747
 Lichfield 50 (1730) – broken up 1744
 Greenwich 50 (1730) – wrecked 1744
 Newcastle 50 (1732) – broken up 1746
 Fifth rates of 40–44 guns
These small two-decker warships were not ships of the line as they were not powerful enough to stand in the line of battle. They were informally described as frigates and are included in the article on that topic.

Non-Establishment 60-gun ships
 Centurion 60 (1732) – Used by Anson in his world voyage, reduced to 50 guns 1744, broken up 1769
 Rippon 60 (1735) – broken up 1751

1733 Proposals
 First rate of 100 guns
 Victory 100 (1737) – wrecked 1744
 Second rates of 90 guns
 Duke 90 (1739) – broken up 1769
 St George 90 (1740) – broken up 1774
 Third rates of 80 guns
 Boyne 80 (1739) – broken up 1763
 Cumberland 80 (1739) – reduced to 66 guns in 1747, foundered 1760
 Third rates of 70 guns
 Elizabeth 70 (1737) – broken up 1766
 Suffolk 70 (1739) – broken up 1765
 Essex 70 (1740) – wrecked 1759
 Nassau 70 (1740) – sold 1770
 Prince Frederick 70 (1740) – sold 1784
 Bedford 70 (1741) – hulked 1767, sold 1787
 Royal Oak 70 (1741) – hulked 1757, broken up 1763
 Stirling Castle 70 (1742) – lost 1762
 Monmouth 70 (1742) – broken up 1767
 Revenge 70 (1742) – sold 1787
 Captain 70 (1743) – reduced to 64 guns 1760, storeship 1777, broken up 1783
 Berwick 70 (1743) – broken up 1760
 Fourth rates of 60 guns
  60 (1735) – scuttled as a breakwater 1756
 Worcester 60 (1735) – broken up 1765
 Weymouth 60 (1736) – wrecked 1745
 Augusta 60 (1736) – broken up 1765
 Dragon 60 (1736) – scuttled as breakwater 1757
 Jersey 60 (1736) – hospital ship 1771, abandoned 1783
 Superb 60 (1736) – broken up 1757
 Lion 60 (1738) – sold 1765
 Kingston 60 (1740) – sold 1762
 Rupert 60 (1740) – Rebuild of 1713 Rupert to a different design, broken up 1769
 Dreadnought 60 (1742) – sold 1784
 Medway 60 (1740) – broken up 1749
 Princess Mary 60 (1742) – Sold 1762
 Exeter 60 (1744) – broken up 1763
 Nottingham 60 (1745) – scuttled as breakwater 1773
 Fourth rates of 50 guns
 Gloucester 50 (1737) – damaged in storm and burnt to avoid capture 1742
 St Albans 50 (1737) – wrecked 1744
 Severn 50 (1739) – captured by France 1746
  50 (1740) – hulk 1769, sold 1786
 Hampshire 50 (1741) – broken up 1766
 Leopard 50 (1741) – broken up 1761
 Nonsuch 50 (1741) – broken up 1766
 Sutherland 50 (1741) – sold 1770
 Antelope 50 (1742) – sold 1783
 Dartmouth 50 (1741) – sunk 1747 in action with the Spanish ship of the line Glorioso
 Woolwich 50 (1741) – broken up 1747
 Preston 50 (1742) – hulk 1748, broken up 1749

Smaller ships (fifth rates)

These small two-decker warships were not ships of the line as they were not powerful enough to stand in the line of battle. They were informally described as frigates and are included in the article on that topic.

List of ships-of-the-line of the Royal Navy (1741–55)
Number of main guns follows name (see rating system of the Royal Navy)
Except where stated otherwise, these ships are listed in the order of pp. 171-175 The Ship of the Line Volume I, by Brian Lavery, pub Conways, 1983,

1741 proposals
 First rates of 100 guns
None built
 Second rates of 90 guns
 Ramillies 90 (1749) – wrecked 1760
 Prince 90 (1750) – broken up 1773
 Third rates of 80 guns
 Newark 80 (1747) – broken up 1787
 Lancaster 80 (1749) – completed as a ship of 66 guns. broken up 1773
 Devonshire 80 (1745) – cut down and reduced to a 74-gun ship 1747, then immediately reduced further to a 66-gun ship. Broken up 1772
 Culloden 80 (1747) – re-ordered and completed as a ship of 74 guns. sold 1770
 Somerset 80 (-) – re-ordered as a ship of 66 guns, but cancelled 1748
 Third rates of 70 guns (the ships were all re-classed as 64-gun ships)
Northumberland 66 (1743) – captured 1744
 Edinburgh 66 (1744) – broken up 1771
 Hampton Court 66 (1744) – broken up 1774
 Kent 64 (1746) – hulked 1760
 modified from the 1741 Establishment (lengthened by 6 ft)
 Yarmouth 64 (1745) – reduced to 60 guns in 1781, broken up 1811
 Fourth rates of 58 guns (classed as 58s, those ships actually had 62 gun ports)
 Princess Louisa 58 (1744) – broken up 1766
 Defiance 58 (1744) – sold 1766
 Canterbury 58 (1744) – harbour service 1761, broken up 1770
 Sunderland 58 (1745) – foundered 1761
 Tilbury 58 (1745) – foundered 1757
 Eagle 58 (1745) – sold 1767
 Non-Establishment 60 gun ship
 Windsor 58 (1745) – sold 1777
 Fourth rates of 50 guns
 Chester 50 (1743) – sold 1767
 Harwich 50 (1743) – wrecked 1760
 Winchester 50 (1744) – sold 1769
 Maidstone 50 (1744) – wrecked 1747
 Colchester 50 (1744) – wrecked 1744
 Portland 50 (1744) – sold 1763
 Falkland 50 (1744) – given to victualling depot 1768
 Salisbury 50 (1745) – condemned 1761
 Advice 50 (1745) – broken up 1756
 Gloucester 50 (1745) – broken up 1764
 Norwich 50 (1745) – sold 1768
 Ruby 50 (1745) – broken up 1765
 Colchester 50 (1746) – broken up 1773
 Lichfield 50 (1746) – wrecked 1758
 Panther 50 (1746) – broken up 1756
 Bristol class – Non-Establishment 50-gun ships (lengthened by 6 feet)
 Bristol (1746) – broken up 1768
 Rochester (1749) – sold 1770

1745 Establishment
 First rates of 100 guns Royal George 100 (1756) – foundered 1782
  Britannia 100 (1762) – renamed Princess Royal 1810, St George 1812, St Barfleur 1819, broken up 1825
 Second rates of 90 gunsNone built
 Third rates of 80 guns Princess Amelia 80 (1757) – lent to customs 1788, sold 1818
 Third rates of 70 guns Vanguard 70 (1748) – sold 1774
 Somerset 70 (1748) – wrecked 1778
 Orford 70 (1749) – harbour service 1777, sunk as a breakwater 1783
 Grafton 70 (1750) – sold 1767
 Swiftsure 70 (1750) – sold 1773
 Northumberland 70 (1750) – renamed Leviathan storeship 1777, foundered 1779
 Buckingham 70 (1751) – renamed Grampus storeship 1771, lost 1778
 Fourth rates of 60 guns St Albans 60 (1747) – sold 1765
 Anson 60 (1747) – sold 1773
 Tiger 60 (1747) – hulked 1760, sold 1765
 Weymouth 60 (1752) – broken up 1772
 Medway class (Allin, modified from the 1745 Establishment)
 Medway 60 (1755) – receiving ship 1787, broken up 1811
 York 60 (1753) – broken up 1772
 Fourth rates of 50 guns Assistance 50 (1747) – sold 1773.
 Greenwich 50 (1747) – captured by France 1757.
 Tavistock 50 (1747) – hulked 1761, broken up 1768.
 Falmouth 50 (1752) – abandoned aground 1765.
 Newcastle 50 (1750) – wrecked 1761.
 Dartmouth 50 (-) – cancelled 1748.
 Severn 50 (1747) – sold 1759.
 Woolwich 50 (-) – cancelled 1748.

1745 Establishment, as amended in 1750
 Second rates of 90 guns Namur 90 (1755) – reduced to 74 in 1805, harbour service 1807, broken up 1833
 Union 90 (1756) – hospital ship 1799, broken up 1816
 Neptune 90 (1757) – sheer hulk 1799, broken up 1816
 Third rate of 80 guns Cambridge 80 (1755) – harbour service 1793, broken up 1808
 Third rate of 70 guns Chichester 70 (1753) – broken up 1803
 Fourth rates of 60 guns Dunkirk class (Allin)
 Dunkirk 60 (1754) – harbour service 1778, sold 1792
 Achilles 60 (1757) – hulked 1778
 America 60 (1757) – broken up 1771
 Montague class ("Admiralty" design)
 Montague 60 (1757) – sunk as a breakwater 1774
 Fourth rate of 50 guns Preston 50 (1757) – sheer hulk 1785, broken up 1815.

1745 Establishment, as amended in 1752
 Fourth rates of 60 guns Pembroke class, (Allin, lines similar to the draught of the Monarch, a French 74, captured in 1747)
 Pembroke 60 (1757) – hulked 1776, broken up 1793
 Rippon class (Allin)
 Rippon 60 (1758) – harbour service 1801, broken up 1808
 Fourth rate of 50 guns Chatham 50 (1758) – harbour service 1793, renamed Tilbury 1805/10, broken up 1814

1745 Establishment, as amended in 1754
 Third rates of 68 guns Burford class Burford 68 (1757) – sold 1785
 Dorsetshire 68 (1757) – broken up 1775
 Boyne 68 (1766) – broken up 1783

1745 Establishment, as amended in 1756
 Temple class copied from 1745 Establishment Vanguard
 Temple 68 (1758) – sank 1762
 Conqueror 68 (1758) – wrecked 1760

Captured ships, War of 1739–48
 Princess 70 (1740) – ex-Spanish Princessa captured 8 April 1740, hulk 1760, sold 1784
 Vigilant 58 (1745) – ex-French Le Vigilant captured 19 May 1745, sold 1759
 Portland's Prize 50 (1746) – ex-French L'Auguste, captured 9 February 1746, sold 1749
 Mars 64 (1746) – ex-French Le Mars captured 11 October 1746, wrecked 1755
 Intrepid 64 (1747) – ex-French Le Sérieux captured 3 May 1747 at First Battle of Cape Finisterre, broken up 1765
 Invincible 74 (1747) – ex-French L'Invincible captured 3 May 1747 at First Battle of Cape Finisterre, wrecked 1758
 Isis 50 (1747) – ex-French Le Diamant 56 captured 3 May 1747 at First Battle of Cape Finisterre, sold 1766
 Monarch 74 (1747) – ex-French Le Monarque, captured 14 October 1747 at Second Battle of Cape Finisterre, sold 1760
 Terrible 74 (1747) – ex-French Le Terrible, captured 14 October 1747 at Second Battle of Cape Finisterre, broken up 1763
 Fougueux 64 (1747) – ex-French Le Fougueux captured 14 October 1747 at Second Battle of Cape Finisterre, broken up 1759
 Trident 64 (1747) – ex-French Trident captured 14 October 1747 at Second Battle of Cape Finisterre, sold 1763
 Magnanime 74 (1748) – ex-French Le Magnanime captured 31 January 1748, broken up 1775

Other captured ships
 Rubis – ex-French Rubis 52, captured 3 May 1747 at First Battle of Cape Finisterre, was added to the Royal Navy as a sixth rate of 26 guns.
 Jason 50 – ex-French Jason, captured 3 May 1747 at First Battle of Cape Finisterre, was added to the Royal Navy as a fifth rate of 44 guns.
 Severn – ex-French Severn 50/56 (originally the British Severn, taken by the French in 1746), was re-captured 14 October 1747 at the Second Battle of Cape Finisterre, but was not restored to British service.
 The ex-French Neptune 70/74, captured 14 October 1747 at Second Battle of Cape Finisterre, was not added to the British Navy.
 Glory – ex-Spanish Glorioso captured 1747, was not added to the British Navy.

Other ships
Two ships of 74 guns were ordered in January 1748 from Chatham and Woolwich Dockyards, but with the end of the War of Austrian Succession both were cancelled in 1748.

List of ships-of-the-line of the Royal Navy (1755–85)
By or soon after the appointment of Baron George Anson as First Lord of the Admiralty in 1751, the system of establishments that covered the design of British warships was abandoned, and with the appointment of Thomas Slade and William Bately as joint holders of the post of Surveyor of the Navy in 1755, new principles governed the composition of the battle fleet.  The Navy Board stopped building any further three-decker 80-gun ships. Production of the 70-gun and 60-gun ships also ceased. Instead, new 74-gun and 64-gun ships replaced these classes. Although 50-gun and 44-gun two-deckers continued to be built for cruising duties, the Navy no longer considered the 50-gun ships powerful enough to serve as ships of the line.
Number of main guns follows name (see rating system of the Royal Navy)

First rate of 100 guns (three-deckers)
 Victory class (Slade)
 Victory 100 (1765) – "great repair" 1801–03, flagship at the Battle of Trafalgar 1805, 1805–08 modernised and re-rated as 98-gun second rate, hulked at Portsmouth 1824, dry-docked 1922, converted during the 1920s to her 1805 appearance, preserved in commission at Portsmouth as the only remaining ship of the line
 Royal Sovereign class (Williams)
 Royal Sovereign 100 (1786) – broken up 1841
 Umpire class (Hunt)
 Royal George 100 (1788) – broken up 1822
 Queen Charlotte 100 (1790) – an accidental fire in 1800 destroyed her and killed 673 of her crew of 859
 Queen Charlotte 104 (1810) – renamed Excellent 1860, broken up 1892

Second rates of 90 guns [later 98 guns] (three-deckers)
 Sandwich class (Slade)
 Sandwich 90 (1759) – floating battery 1780, harbour service 1790, broken up 1810
 Blenheim 90 (1761) – reduced to 74 in 1800; foundered, presumably off Madagascar, with all hands 1807
 Ocean 90 (1761) – Modified version of the Sandwich class, sold 1793
 London class (Slade)
 London 90 (1766) – broken up 1811
 Barfleur class (Slade, based on Royal William)
 Barfleur 90 (1768) – broken up 1819
 Prince George 90 (1772) – broken up 1839
 Princess Royal 90 (1773) – broken up 1807
 Formidable 90/98 (1777) – broken up 1813
 Queen class (Bately)
 Queen 90 (1769) – reduced to 74 in 1811, broken up 1821
 Duke class (Williams)
 Duke 98 (1777) – broken up 1843
 St George 98 (1785) – wrecked 1811 off the coast of Jutland with the loss of almost her entire crew
 Glory 98 (1788) – broken up 1825
 Atlas 98 (1782) – broken up 1821
 Revived London class (Slade)
 Prince 98 (1788) – lengthened by 17 ft in 1796, broken up 1837
 Impregnable 98 (1786) – wrecked 1799, with no loss of life, on the Chichester Shoals
 Windsor Castle 98 (1790) – razeed to 74-gun-ship 1814, broken up 1839
 Boyne class (Hunt)
 Boyne 98 (1790) – caught fire by accident and blew up at Spithead 1795
 Prince of Wales 98 (1794) – broken up 1822.

Third rates of 80 guns (two-deckers)
 Caesar class (Hunt)
 Caesar 80 (1793) – 1814 hulked – used as army depot at Portsmouth, broken up 1821

Third rates of 74 guns (two-deckers)
 Dublin class (Slade)
 Dublin 74 (1757) – the first British "74". Broken up 1784
 Norfolk 74 (1757) – broken up 1774
 Lenox 74 (1758) – scuttled 1784
 Mars 74 (1759) – sold 1784
 Shrewsbury 74 (1758) – condemned 1783
 Warspite 74 (1758) – broken up 1802
 Resolution 74 (1758) – wrecked 1759
 Fame class (Bately)
 Fame 74 (1759) – renamed Guilford c. 1799, sold 1814
 Hero class (Slade)
 Hero 74 (1759) – broken up 1810
 Hercules class (Slade) – modified Hero class
 Hercules 74 (1759) – sold 1784
 Thunderer 74 (1760) – wrecked 1780
 Bellona class (Slade)
 Bellona 74 (1760) – broken up 1814
 Dragon 74 (1760) – sold 1784
 Superb 74 (1760) – wrecked 1783
 Kent 74 (1762) – sold 1784
 Defence 74 (1763) – wrecked 1811
 Valiant class – modified Dublin class
 Valiant (1759) – broken up 1826
 Triumph (1764) – broken up 1850
 Arrogant class (Slade) – modified Bellona class
 Arrogant 74 (1761) – broken up 1810
 Cornwall 74 (1761) – scuttled/burnt 1780
 Edgar 74 (1779) – broken up 1835
 Goliath 74 (1781) – razéed to 58 guns 1813, broken up 1815
 Zealous 74 (1785) – broken up 1816
 Audacious 74 (1785) – broken up 1815
 Elephant 74 (1786) – razéed to 58 guns 1818, broken up 1830
 Bellerophon 74 (1786) – sold 1836
 Saturn 74 (1786) – razéed to 58 guns 1813, broken up 1868
 Vanguard 74 (1787) – broken up 1821
 Excellent 74 (1787) – razéed to 58 guns 1820, broken up 1835
 Illustrious 74 (1789) – wrecked 1795
 Canada class (Bately)
 Canada 74 (1765) – re-classed as 76 in 1780, hulked. Receiving ship at Chatham 1810, powder magazine 1814, convict ship 1826, broken up 1834.
 Majestic 74 (1785) – razéed to 58 guns 1813, broken up 1816
 Orion 74 (1787) – broken up 1814
 Captain 74 (1787) – hulked, receiving ship at Plymouth 1809, burnt by accident and broken up 1813
 Albion class (Slade)
 Albion 74 (1763) – floating battery 1794, wrecked 1797
 Grafton 74 (1771) – broken up 1816
 Alcide 74 (1779) – broken up 1817
 Fortitude 74 (1780) – broken up 1820
 Irresistible 74 (1782) – broken up 1806
 Ramillies class (Slade)
 Ramillies 74 (1763) – fire 1782
 Monarch 74 (1765) – broken up 1813
 Magnificent 74 (1766) – wrecked 1804
 Marlborough 74 (1767) – wrecked 1800
 Suffolk class (Bately)
 Suffolk 74 (1765) – broken up 1803
 Modified Ramillies class (Slade)
 Terrible 74 (1762) – fire 1781
 Russell 74 (1764) – sold 1811
 Invincible 74 (1765) – wrecked 1801
 Robust 74 (1764) – broken up 1817
 Prince of Wales 74 (1765) – ex-Hibernia, broken up 1783
 Modified Suffolk class (Bately)
 Ajax 74 (1765) – sold 1785
 Royal Oak class (Williams)
 Royal Oak 74 (1769) – broken up 1815
 Conqueror 74 (1773) – broken up 1794
 Bedford 74 (1775) – broken up 1817
 Hector 74 (1774) – broken up 1816
 Vengeance 74 (1774) – broken up 1816
 Sultan 74 (1775) – broken up 1816
 Egmont class (Slade)
 Egmont 74 (1768) – broken up 1799
 Elizabeth class (Slade)
 Elizabeth 74 (1769) – broken up 1797
 Resolution 74 (1770) – broken up 1813
 Cumberland 74 (1774) – broken up 1804
 Berwick 74 (1775) – captured by France 1795, recaptured and wrecked, 1805
 Bombay Castle 74 (1782) – wrecked 1796
 Powerful 74 (1783) – broken up 1812
 Defiance 74 (1783) – broken up 1817
 Swiftsure 74 (1787) – captured by France 1801, same name, recaptured at the Battle of Trafalgar, 1805, renamed Irresistible 1805, broken up 1816
 Culloden class (Slade)
 Culloden 74 (1776) – wrecked 1781
 Thunderer 74 (1783) – broken up 1814
 Venerable 74 (1784) – wrecked 1804
 Victorious 74 (1785) – broken up 1803
 Ramillies 74 (1785) – broken up 1850
 Terrible 74 (1785) – broken up 1836
 Hannibal 74 (1786) – captured by France 1801
 Theseus 74 (1786) – broken up 1814
 Alfred class (Williams)
 Alfred 74 (1778) – broken up 1814
 Alexander 74 (1778) – broken up 1819
 Warrior 74 (1781) – broken up 1857
 Montague 74 (1779) – broken up 1818
 Ganges class (Hunt), also known as Culloden class
 Ganges 74 (1782) – broken up 1816
 Culloden 74 (1783) – broken up 1813
 Tremendous 74 (1784) – sold 1897
 Invincible 74 (1808) – broken up 1861
 Minden 74 (1810) – sold 1861
 Minotaur 74 (1816) – renamed Hermes
 Carnatic class built to the lines of the French Courageux (capture of 1761)
 Leviathan 74 (1790) – hulked 1816
 Carnatic 74 (1783) – hulked 1805
 Colossus 74 (1787) – wrecked 1798
 Minotaur 74 (1793) – wrecked 1810

Third rates of 64 guns (two-deckers)
 Asia class (Slade)
 Asia 64 (1764) – broken up 1804
 Essex class (Slade) – modified Asia class
 Essex 64 (1760) – sold 1779/99
 Africa 64 (1761) – sold 1774
 St Albans class (Slade)
 St Albans 64 (1764) – broken up 1814
 Augusta 64 (1763) – burnt 1777
 Director 64 (1784) – broken up 1801
 Exeter class (Bately)
 Exeter 64 (1763) – burnt 1784
 Europa 64 (1765) – broken up 1814
 Trident 64 (1768) – sold 1816
 Prudent 64 (1768) – sold 1814
 Ardent class (Slade)
 Ardent 64 (1764) – captured 1779, recaptured 1782, sold 1784
 Raisonnable 64 (1768) – broken up 1815
 Agamemnon 64 (1781) – wrecked 1809
 Belliqueux 64 (1781) – broken up 1816
 Stately 64 (1784)
 Nassau 64 (1785) – wrecked 1799
 Indefatigable 64 (1784) – razéed to 44-gun frigate 1794, broken up 1816
 Worcester class (Slade)
 Worcester 64 (1769) – hulked at Deptford 1788, broken up 1816
 Lion 64 (1777) – sold for breaking 1837
 Stirling Castle 64 (1775) – wrecked 1780
 Intrepid class (Williams)
 Intrepid 64 (1770) – sold for breaking 1828.
 Monmouth 64 (1772) – broken up 1818.
 Defiance 64 (1772) – sank 1780.
 Nonsuch 64 (1774) – broken up 1802.
 Ruby 64 (1776) – broken up 1821.
 Vigilant 64 (1774) – broken up 1816.
 Eagle 64 (1774) – broken up 1812.
 America 64 (1777) – broken up 1807.
 Anson 64 (1781) – razéed to 44-gun frigate 1794, wrecked 1807
 Polyphemus 64 (1782) – broken up 1827.
 Magnanime 64 (1780) – razéed to 44-gun frigate 1794, broken up 1813.
 Sampson 64 (1781) – sold for breaking 1832.
 Repulse 64 (1780) – wrecked 1800.
 Diadem 64 (1782) – broken up 1832.
 Standard 64 (1782) – broken up 1816.
 Inflexible class (Williams)
 Inflexible 64 (1780) – storeship 1793–95, troopship 1800–07, hulked as floating magazine Halifax Nova Scotia 1809, broken up 1820
 Africa 64 (1781) – hospital ship 1795–1805, broken up 1814
 Dictator 64 (1783) – troopship 1798–1803, floating battery 1803–05, troopship 1813, broken up 1817
 Sceptre 64 (1781) – wrecked at Table Bay 5 December 1799
 Crown class (Hunt)
 Crown 64 (1782) – hulked 1798
 Ardent 64 (1782) – blew up 1794
 Scipio 64 (1782) – broken up 1798
 Veteran 64 (1787) – hulked 1809

Fourth rates of 60 guns (two-deckers)
 Edgar class (Slade)
 Edgar 60/64 (1758) – scuttled 1774
 Panther 60 (1758) – broken up 1813
 Firm 60 (1759) – sold 1791

Fourth rates of 50 guns (two-deckers)
Note that from 1756 onward the 50-gun ships were no longer counted as ships of the line as the Navy no longer considered them powerful enough to stand in the line of battle.
 Warwick class (Bately)
 Warwick 50 (1767) – sold 1802
 Romney class (Slade)
 Romney 50 (1762) – wrecked 1804, with the loss of nine lives, on the Haaks on South Sand Head due to the fog and the ignorance of the pilots
 Salisbury class (Slade) – modified Romney class
 Salisbury 50 (1769) – wrecked, without loss of life, 1796 on the Isle of Vache near St. Domingo in the West Indies
 Centurion 50 (1774) – sank at her moorings at Halifax 1824, refloated, broken up 1825
 Portland class (Williams)
 Portland 50 (1770) – sold 1817
 Bristol 50 (1775) – broken up 1810
 Renown 50 (1774) – broken up 1794
 Isis 50 (1774) – broken up 1810
 Leopard 50 (1790) – wrecked 1814 near the Isle of Anacosti in the Saint Lawrence River due to the disobedience and neglect of the officer of the watch
 Hannibal 50 (1779) – captured by France 1782
 Jupiter 50 (1778) – wrecked 1808, with no loss of life, in Vigo Bay
 Leander 50 (1780) – captured by France 1798, captured by Russia 1799, returned to Britain, converted to hospital ship 1806, renamed Hygeia 1813, sold 1817
 Adamant 50 (1780) – broken up 1814
 Assistance 50 (1781) – wrecked 1802 on the outer banks of the northern part of Dunkirk Dyke due to the ignorance of her pilot, but with no loss of life due to the help of a Flemish pilot boat
 Europa 50 (1783) – sold 1814
 Experiment class (Williams)
 Experiment 50 (1774) – captured by France 1779
 Medusa 50 (1785) – wrecked 1798
 Grampus class (Hunt)
 Grampus 50 (1782) – broken up 1794
 Cato 50 (1782) – disappeared 1782
 Trusty class (Hunt)
 Trusty 50 (1782) – broken up 1815

Captured ships
 Alcide 64 (1743, ex-French Alcide, captured 1755); sold 1772
 Lys 64 (1746, ex-French Lys, captured 1755)
 Duc d'Aquitaine 64 (1754, ex-French Duc d'Aquitaine, captured 1757)
 Foudroyant 80 (1750, ex-French Foudroyant, captured 1758); broken up 1787
 Raisonnable 64 (1756, ex-French Rainsonnable, captured 1758); lost 1762
 Bienfaisant 64 (1754, ex-French Bienfaisant, captured 1758); broken up 1814
 Belliqueux 64 (1756, ex-French Belliqueux, captured 1758); broken up 1772
 Modeste 64 (1759, ex-French Modeste, captured 1759); broken up 1800
 Centaur 74 (1757, ex-French Centaure, captured 1759); foundered 1782 with the loss of most of her crew
 Temeraire 74 (1749, ex-French Téméraire, captured 1759); sold 1784
 Formidable 80 (1751, ex-French Formidable, captured 1759); broken up 1768
 Courageux 74 (1753, ex-French Courageux, captured 1761) wrecked 1796
 Belleisle 64 (1760, ex-French Belleisle, captured 1761); sold 1819
 Saint Ann 64 (1759, ex-French Saint Ann, captured 1761)
 San Antonio 70 (1761, ex-Spanish San Antonio, captured 1762); sold 1775
 Prince William 64 (ex-Spanish Guipuscoana, captured 1780) Converted to a Sheer Hulk 1790, broken up 1817
 Gibraltar 80 (1749, ex-Spanish Fenix, captured 1780) – broken up 1836
 Princessa 70 (1750, ex-Spanish Princessa, captured 1780) Converted to a Sheer Hulk 1784, broken up 1809
 Monarca 70 (1756, ex-Spanish Monarca, captured 1780) Sold 1791
 Diligent 70 (1756, ex-Spanish Diligente, captured 1780)
 San Miguel 70 (1773, ex-Spanish San Miguel, captured 1780)
 Prothee 64 (1772, ex-French Protée, captured 1780) Converted to a Prison Ship 1799, Broken up 1815
 Princess Caroline (ex-Dutch, captured 1780) – Scuttled 1799
 Rotterdam 50 (ex-Dutch, captured 1781) – sold 1806
 Caesar 74 (ex-French César, captured 1782) – Blew up 1782
 Hector 74 (1755, ex-French Hector, captured 1782)
 Glorieux 74 (1756, ex-French Glorieux, captured 1782)
 Pegase 74 (1781, ex-French Glorieux, captured 1782) Converted to a Prison Ship 1799, Broken up 1815
 Caton 64 (1777, ex-French Caton, captured 1782) Sold 1815
 Argonaut 64 (1779, ex-French Jason, captured 1782) Broken up 1831
 Solitaire 64 (1774, ex-French Solitaire, captured 1782) Sold 1790

List of ships-of-the-line of the Royal Navy (1785–1830)

First rates of 120 guns (three-deckers)
 Caledonia class (Rule)
 Caledonia 120 (1808) – renamed Dreadnought, broken up 1875
 Britannia 120 (1820) – broken up 1869
 Prince Regent 120 (1823) – converted to screw, broken up 1873
 Royal George 120 (1827) – converted to screw, broken up 1875
  Nelson class ('Surveyors' = Rule & Peake)
 Nelson 120 (1814) – 1859–60 cut down to 91-gun 2-decker and converted to screw, 1867 given to New South Wales Government and fitted as school ship, 1898 sold, 1928 broken up.  No sea service as either sail or steam line-of-battle ship.
 Saint Vincent 120 (1815) – sold 1906
 Howe 120 (1815) – broken up 1854
 Saint George class – broadened version of Caledonia
 Saint George 120 (1840) – sold 1883
 Royal William 120 (1833) – laid down as 120-gun ship. Burnt 1899
 Neptune 120 (1832) – cut down to 2-decker and converted to 2-decker steam line-of-battle ship 1859, broken up 1875,
 Waterloo 120 (1833) – cut down to an 89-gun 2-decker and converted to steam in 1859, and was renamed Conqueror in 1862.  In 1877, she was renamed Warspite and served as a training ship at Greenhithe/Woolwich.  She burned accidentally in 1918.
 Trafalgar 120 (1841) – laid down as 106-gun ship. Sold 1906

First rates of 112 guns (three-deckers)
 Wolfe class
 Wolfe 112 (-) – Laid down 1814, construction suspended in 1815 and cancelled 1831. Destroyed in a storm 1832.
 Canada 112 (-) – Laid down 1814, construction suspended in 1815. Cancelled in 1831 and broken up.

First rates of 110 guns (three-deckers)
 Ville de Paris class (Henslow)
 Ville de Paris 110 (1795) – hulked 1825, broken up 1845.
 Hibernia class (Henslow) – lengthened version of Ville de Paris
 Hibernia 110 (1804) – sold 1902
 Ocean class (Henslow) – lengthened version of Neptune class Second Rates
 Ocean 110 (1805) – cut down to 80-gun 2-decker 1821, hulked 1831, coal depot 1852, broken up 1875

First rates of 100–104 guns (three-deckers) – later rated as 110 guns
 Impregnable class (Rule)
 Impregnable 104 (1810) – harbour flagship Plymouth 1839, hulked as training ship 1862, renamed Kent 1883, renamed Caledonia 1891, sold 1906
 St. Lawrence class
 St Lawrence 102 (1814) – laid down 1814. Operated only on Lake Ontario. Decommissioned 1815 and sold 1832.
 Trafalgar class (Rule) – modified Impregnable
 Trafalgar 100 (1820) – renamed Camperdown 1825, hulked as coal deport Portsmouth 1860, renamed Pitt 1882, sold 1906
 Princess Charlotte class (Rule) – modified Impregnable
 Princess Charlotte 104 (1825) – hulked as floating barracks Hong Kong 1857, sold 1875
 Royal Adelaide 104 (1828) – ex-London, 1869 hulked as flag and receiving ship Plymouth, to Chatham 1891, sold 1905

Second rates of 98 guns (three-deckers)
 Neptune class (Henslow)
 Dreadnought 98 (1801) – broken up 1857.
 Neptune 98 (1797) – broken up 1818.
 Temeraire 98 (1798) – broken up 1838.
 Boyne class – built to the lines of Slade's Victory
 Boyne 98 (1810) – renamed Excellent 1834, broken up 1861
 Union 98 (1811) – broken up 1833

Second rates of 90/92 guns (two-deckers)
 Rodney class (Seppings)
 Rodney 92 (1833) – converted to screw 1860, broken up 1882
 Nile 92 (1839) – converted to screw 1854, destroyed by fire 1956
 London 92 (1840) – converted to screw 1858, sold 1884

Second rates of 84 guns (two-deckers)
 Formidable class (Seppings) – lines of the  Canopus  (ex-French Franklin, captured at the Battle of the Nile in 1798), but structurally different; although Canopus was not considered a member of the class, the class are often known as the 'Canopus class'.
 Formidable 84 (1825) – sold 1906
 Modified Formidable class built in teak in India
 Ganges 84 (1821) – sold 1929
 Asia 84 (1824) – flagship at the Battle of Navarino, 1827, sold 1908
 Bombay 84 (1828) – converted to screw 1861, destroyed by accidental fire 1864
 Further modified Formidable class built in India
 Calcutta 84 (1831) – sold 1908
 Modified Formidable class
 Monarch 84 (1832) – broken up 1862–66
 Vengeance 84 (1824) – sold 1897
 Thunderer 84 (1831) – sold 1901
 Powerful 84 (1826) – broken up 1860–64
 Clarence 84 (1827) – ex-Goliath, accidentally burnt in the Mersey in 1884

Third rates of 80 guns (two-deckers)
 Foudroyant class (Henslow)
 Foudroyant 80 (1798) – hulked as gunnery training ship Plymouth 1861, sold to Wheatley Cobb as boys training ship, wrecked on Blackpool Sands while on a fund raising and propaganda tour
 Rochfort class (Barrallier)
 Rochfort 80 (1814) – broken up 1826
 Sandwich 80 (-) – ordered 1809, keel laid Dec 1809, cancelled 1811
 Waterloo class (Peake)
 Waterloo 80 (1818) – renamed Bellerophon 1824, became receiving ship Plymouth, sold 1892
 Cambridge class – lines of Danish Christian VII taken 1807
 Cambridge 80 (1815) – later classed as 82, hulked as gunnery training ship Plymouth 1856, broken up 1869
 Indus class – enlarged lines of Danish Christian VII taken 1807
 Indus 80 (1839) – hulked 1860 as harbour flagship Plymouth, sold for breaking 1898
 Hindostan class – enlarged lines of Repulse
 Hindostan 80 (1841) – hulked 1884 as cadet training ship at Dartmouth, training ship for boy artificers at Portsmouth renamed Fishgard III 1905, sold for breaking up 1921

Third rates of 74 guns (two-deckers)
 Brunswick class ('Admiralty')
 Brunswick 74 (1790) – hulked as prison ship Chatham 1812, powder magazine 1814, lazaretto Sheerness 1825, broken up 1826
 Mars class (Henslow)
 Mars 74 (1794) – hulked as receiving ship Portsmouth 1814, broken up 1819
 Centaur 74 (1797) – broken up 1819
 Courageux class (Henslow)
 Courageux 74 (1800) – hulked as lazaretto Chatham 1814, broken up 1832
 Plantagenet class (Rule)
 Plantagenet 74 (1801) – broken up 1817
 Bulwark class (Rule)
 Bulwark 74 (1807) – ex-Scipio, broken up 1826
 Valiant – ordered 1826, but not started
 Ajax class – modified version of 1757 Valiant class
 Ajax 74 (1798) – accidentally burnt off Tenedos 14 & 15 February 1807
 Kent 74 (1798) – sheer hulk at Plymouth 1857, broken up 1881
 Conqueror class  (Henslow) – modified Mars class
 Conqueror 74 (1801) – broken up 1822
 Dragon class (Rule)
 Dragon 74 (1798) – lazaretto at Pembroke 1824, receiving ship and marine barracks 1832, renamed Fame 1842, broken up 1850
 America class – lines of French Impetueux taken 1794
 Northumberland 74 (1798) – lazaretto at Sheerness 1827, broken up 1850
 Renown 74 (1798) – hospital ship Plymouth 1814, later to Deptford(?), broken up 1835(?)
 Spencer class (Barralier)
 Spencer 74 (1800) – broken up 1822
 Achille class – lines of French Pompée taken 1793
 Achille 74 (1798) – sold for breaking 1865
 Superb 74 (1798) – broken up 1826
 Revenge class – lines of French Impetueux taken 1794
 Revenge 74 (1806) – broken up 1840
 Milford class – lines of French Impetueux taken 1794
 Milford 74 (1806) – lazaretto at Pembroke 1825, broken up 1846
 Princess Amelia 74 (-) – keel laid 1 January 1799, cancelled March 1800
 Colossus class (Henslow)
 Colossus 74 (1803) – broken up 1826
 Warspite 74 (1807) – cut down to 50-gun frigate 1840, hulked 1862 and lent to Marine Society as training ship, accidentally burnt at Woolwich 1876,
 Fame/Hero class (Henslow)
 Fame 74 (1805) – broken up 1817
 Albion 74 (1802) – lazaretto Portsmouth 1831, broken up 1836
 Hero 74 (1803) – wrecked on the Haak Islands 25 December 1811
 Illustrious 74 (1803) – hulked as ordinary guard ship Plymouth 1848, hospital ship 1853, reverted to ordinary guard ship 1859, broken up 1868
 Marlborough 74 (1807) – broken up 1835
 York 74 (1807) – hulked as convict ship Portsmouth 1819, broken up 1835
 Hannibal 74 (1810) – lazaretto Plymouth 1825, later to Pembroke(?), broken up 1834
 Sultan 74 (1807) – hulked as receiving ship Portsmouth 1861, target ship 1862, broken up 1864
 Royal Oak 74 (1809) – hulked as receiving ship Bermuda 1825, broken up 1850
 Modified Carnatic class (derived from prize Courageux, taken from the French 1761)
 Aboukir 74 (1807) – hulked 1824, sold 1838.
 Bombay 74 (1808) – renamed Blake 1819, hulked 1823, broken up 1855.
 Swiftsure class (Henslow)
 Swiftsure 74 (1804) – hulked as receiving ship Portsmouth 1819, broken up 1845
 Victorious 74 (1808) – hulked as receiving ship Portsmouth 1826, broken up 1861
 Repulse class (Rule) – Talavera structurally different
 Repulse 74 (1803) – broken up 1820
 Eagle 74 (1804) – cut down as 50-gun frigate 1831, hulked at Falmouth for the Coastguard 1857, training ship in Southampton Water 1860, to Liverpool 1862, Mersey Division RNVR 1910, renamed Eaglet 1918, burnt 1926, wreck sold for breaking 1927
 Sceptre 74 (1802) – broken up 1821
 Magnificent 74 (1806) – hulked as receiving ship Jamaica 1823, sold 1843
 Valiant 74 (1807) – broken up 1823
 Elizabeth 74 (1807) – broken up 1820
 Cumberland 74 (1807) – hulked as convict ship and coal deport Chatham, renamed Fortitude 1833, to Sheerness as coal deport by 1856, sold 1870
 Venerable 74 (1808) – hulked as church ship Portsmouth, broken up 1838
 Talavera 74 (1818) – timbered according to Seppings' principle using smaller timbers than usual. Accidentally burnt at Plymouth Oct 1840, then broken up
 Belleisle 74 (1819) – troopship 1841, hulked as hospital ship Sheerness 1854, lent to the seaman's hospital at Greenwich 1866–68, broken up 1872
 Malabar 74 (1818) – hulked as coal deport Portsmouth 1848, renamed Myrtle 1883, sold 1905
 Blake class – lengthened Leviathan class
 Blake 74 (1808) – hulked as temporary prison ship Portsmouth 1814, sold 1816
 San Domingo 74 (1809) – sold 1816
 Armada or Vengeur class.  The most numerous class of British capital ships ever built, with forty vessels being completed to this design (they were popularly known as the "Forty Thieves").
 Armada 74 (1810) – sold 1863
 Cressy 74 (1810) – 1827 planned to be converted to 50-gun frigate but instead broken up 1832
 Vigo 74 (1810) – hulked at receiving ship Plymouth, broken up 1865
 Vengeur 74 (1810) – hulked as receiving ship 1824, broken up 1843
 Ajax 74 (1809) – converted to 60-gun screw blockship, 1847, broken up 1864
 Conquestador 74 (1810) – cut down to 50-gun frigate 1831, hulked War Office powder depot at Purfleet 1856, powder depot Plymouth 1863, sold 1897
 Poictiers 74 (1809) – broken up 1857
 Berwick 74 (1809) – broken up 1821
 Egmont 74 (1810) – hulked as storeship Rio de Janeiro 1863, sold 1875
 Clarence 74 (1812) – renamed Centurion 1826 and planned to be converted to 50-gun frigate but instead broken up 1828
 Edinburgh 74 (1811) – converted to 60-gun screw blockship 1852, sold 1866
 America 74 (1810) – cut down to 50-gun frigate 1835, hulked 1864, broken up 1867
 Scarborough 74 (1812) – sold 1836
 Asia 74 (1811) – renamed Alfred, cut down to 50-gun frigate 1828, hulked as gunnery trials ship Portsmouth 1858, broken up 1865
 Mulgrave 74 (1812) – hulked as a lazaretto Pembroke 1836, powder ship 1844, broken up 1854
 Anson 74 (1812) – hulked as temporary lazaretto Portsmouth 1831, by 1843 to Chatham and then to Tasmania as a convict ship, broken up 1851
 Gloucester 74 (1812) – cut down to 50-gun frigate 1835, hulked as receiving ship Chatham 1861, sold 1884
 Rodney 74 (1809) – renamed Greenwich 1827 and cut down to 50-gun frigate, but conversion probably never completed, sold 1836
 La Hogue 74 (1811) – converted to 60-gun screw blockship 1848, broken up 1865
 Dublin 74 (1812) – cut down to 50-gun frigate 1836, laid up 1845, sold 1885
 Barham 74 (1811) – cut down to 50-gun frigate 1836, broken up 1840
 Benbow 74 (1813) – hulked as marine barracks Sheerness 1848, prison ship for Russians 1854, coal deport 1859, sold for breaking 1894
 Stirling Castle 74 (1811) – hulked as convict ship Plymouth 1839, to Portsmouth 1844, broken up 1861
 Vindictive 74 (1813) – cut down to 50-gun frigate 1833, hulked as depot ship Fernando Po 1862, sold 1871
 Blenheim 74 (1813) – converted to 60-gun screw blockship 1847, hulked at Portsmouth, broken up 1865
 Duncan 74 (1811) – hulked as lazaretto Portsmouth 1826, to Sheerness 1831, broken up 1863
 Rippon 74 (1812) – broken up 1821
 Medway 74 (1812) – hulked as convict ship Bermuda 1847, sold 1865
 Cornwall 74 (1812) – cut down to 50-gun frigate 1830, hulked and lent to London School Ship Society as reformatory 1859, to the Tyne as Wellesley hulk 1868, broken up 1875
 Pembroke 74 (1812) – converted to 60-gun screw blockship 1855, hulked as base ship Chatham 1873, renamed Forte 1890 as receiving hulk, then Pembroke again 1891, sold 1905
 Indus 74 (1812) – renamed Bellona 1818, hulked as receiving ship Plymouth 1842, broken up 1868
 Redoubtable 74 (1815) – broken up 1841
 Devonshire 74 (1812) – hulked and lent to Greenwich Seamen's Hospital as temporary hospital ship 1849, to Sheerness as prison ship for Russians 1854, school ship in Queensborough Swale 1860, broken up 1869
 Defence 74 (1815) – hulked as convict ship Woolwich 1848, burnt and broken up 1857
 Hercules 74 (1815) – troopship 1838, emigrant ship 1852, hulked as army depot ship Hong Kong after 1853, sold 1865
 Agincourt 74 (1817) – hulked as training ship at Plymouth after 1848, renamed Vigo 1865, cholera hospital ship 1866, receiving ship at Plymouth 1870, sold 1884, broken up 1885
 Pitt 74 (1816) – hulked as coal deport and receiving ship at Plymouth 1853, to Portland 1860, later back to Portsmouth, broken up 1877
 Wellington 74 (1816) – ex-Hero, hulked as receiving and depot ship Sheerness 1848, to Coastguard Sheerness 1857, to Liverpool Juvenile Reformatory Association Ltd as training ship and renamed Akbar, sold for breaking 1908
 Russell 74 (1822) – converted to 60-gun screw blockship 1854–55, coastguard ship Sheerness 1858, broken up 1865
 Akbar 74 (-) – keel laid 4 April 1807, cancelled 12 October 1809.  Uncertain whether she was of this class
 Augusta 74 (-) – laid down in 1806, cancelled 1809.
 Julius 74 (-) – projected in 1807 but deleted 1812.
 Orford 74 (-) – projected in 1807 but deleted 1815.
 Cornwallis class – teak-built versions of Armada class
 Cornwallis 74 (1813) – converted to 60-gun screw blockship 1854–55, hulked as a jetty at Sheerness 1865, renamed Wildfire 1916 as base ship, broken up 1957
 Wellesley 74 (1815) – hulked as harbour flagship and receiving ship at Chatham 1862,to Purfleet for the London School Ship Society as a reformatory and renamed Cornwall 1868, sunk by the Luftwaffe 1940 (the only ship-of-the-line ever to be sunk in an air attack)
 Carnatic 74 (1823) – hulked as coal deport Portsmouth 1860, floating magazine for the War Office 1886, returned to the Admiralty 1891, sold 1914
 Black Prince class Note that, while Wellesley belonged officially to this class, plans meant for her construction were lost in 1812 when aboard the Java which was captured by the Americans; so she was actually built to the lines of the Cornwallis (see above).
 Black Prince 74 (1816) – broken up 1855
 Melville 74 (1817) – hulked as hospital ship Hong Kong 1857, sold 1873
 Hawke 74 (1820) – converted to 60-gun screw blockship 1854–55, broken up 1865
 Chatham class – design used captured frames of Franco-Dutch Royal Hollondais
 Chatham 74 (1812) – sold 1817
 Hastings class – purchased from East India Company in 1819
 Hastings 74 (1819) – converted to 60-gun screw blockship 1855, Coastguard 1857, coal hulk 1870, sold 1885
 Class uncertain
 Augusta(?) 74 (-) – keel laid 1806(?), cancelled 1810(?)

Third rates of 72 guns (two-deckers)
 Imaun class – gift to the RN from the Imam of Muscat 1836
 Imaun 70 (1826) – hulked at Jamaica as receiving ship 1842, broken up 1862/66

Fourth rates of 50 guns (two-deckers)
 Antelope class (Henslow)
 Antelope 50 (1802) – broken up 1845
 Diomede class (Henslow) – probably a variant of Antelope
 Diomede 50 (1798) – broken up 1815
 Grampus 50 (1802) – sold 1832
 Jupiter class
 Jupiter 50 (1813) – broken up 1870
 modified Jupiter class
 Salisbury 50 (1814) – sold 1837
 Romney 50 (1815) – sold 1845
 Isis 50 (1819) – sold 1867

Converted East Indiamen
 Calcutta – launched in 1788 as Warley; purchased in 1795; captured by France 1805
 Grampus – launched in 1787 as Ceres; purchased in 1795; grounded in 1799 on the Barking shelf near Woolwich through the ignorance of the pilot and abandoned with no loss of life
 Hindostan – launched in 1789 as Hindostan; purchased in 1795; lost in a fire at sea in 1804
 Abergavenny – launched as Earl of Abergavenny in 1789; purchased in 1795; sold 1807
 Glatton – launched as Glatton in 1792; purchased in 1795; scuttled 1830
 Coromandel – built as Winterton; purchased and launched in 1795; sold 1813
 Madras – built as Lascelles; purchased and launched in 1795; sold 1807
 Weymouth – built as Earl Mansfield; purchased and launched in 1795; wrecked, with no loss of life, in 1800 on the Lisbon Bar while going into Lisbon
 Malabar – launched in 1798 as Cuvera; purchased in 1804; renamed Coromandel in 1815; broken up in 1853
 Hindostan – launched 1798 as Admiral Rainier; purchased in 1804; renamed Dolphin in 1819; renamed Justitia in 1831; sold 1855

Captures of the Revolutionary War

French ships
 Commerce de Marseille 120 (1788) – ex-French, captured 29 August 1793, prison ship by 1800, sold 1802
  Pompée 74 (1791) – ex-French, captured 29 August 1793, broken up 1817
  Juste 80 (1784) – ex-French, captured Glorious First of June in 1794, broken up 1811
  Ça Ira 80 (1784) – ex-French, captured Glorious First of June in 1794, Burnt by accident 11 April 1896.
  Sans Pareil 80 (1793) – ex-French, captured Glorious First of June in 1794, sheer hulk 1810, broken up 1842
  Impétueux 74 (1788) – ex-French America, captured Glorious First of June in 1794, broken up 1813
  Tigre 74 (1793) – ex-French, captured 23 June 1795, broken up 1817
  Belleisle 74 (1788) – ex-French Formidable, captured 23 June 1795, fought at Trafalgar, broken up 1814
 Hercule 74 (1797) – ex-French, captured 20 April 1798, deleted 1810
 Canopus 80 (1797) – ex-French Franklin, captured 1 August 1798, harbour service 1863, sold 1887
 Tonnant 80 (1789) – ex-French captured 1 August 1798, broken up 1821
 Spartiate 74 (1794) – ex-French Spartiate, sheer hulk 1842, broken up 1857
 Donegal 76 (1794) – ex-French Hoche captured 12 October 1798, broken up 1845
  Guerrier 74 (1754) – ex-French Guerrière, captured 2 August 1798, broken up 1810.
  Genereux (1785) 74 (1785) – ex-French, captured 18 February 1800, prison ship 1805, broken up 1816
  Malta (1795) 80 (1795) – ex-French Guillaume Tell, captured 30 March 1800, harbour service 1831, broken up 1840
  Athenienne (1800) 64 (1800) – ex-French Athenien ex-Maltese, captured 30 August 1800, wrecked 1806

Dutch ships
  Overyssel 64 – captured 22 October 1795, hulk 1810, sold 1882
  Zealand 64 – captured 19 January 1796, harbour service 1803, sold 1830

Captured at the Capitulation of Saldanha Bay, 17 August 1796
  Delft 64 – ex-Dutch Hercules, hospital ship by 1804, sold 1817
  Dordrecht 64 – harbour service 1804, sold 1823
  Prince Frederick 64 – ex-Dutch Revolutie, hospital ship by 1804, sold 1817

Captured at the Battle of Camperdown, 11 October 1797
  Vryheid 70 – prison ship 1798, powder hulk 1802, sold 1811.
  Camperdown 70 – ex-Dutch Jupiter, prison ship 1798, powder hulk 1802, sold 1817.
  Gelykheid 64/68 – guardship 1803, sheer hulk 1807, disposed of in 1814.
  Admiral De Vries 64 – harbour service 1800, sold 1806
  Haarlem 64 – harbour service 1811, sold 1816
  Wassenar 64 – hulk 1804, sold 1818

Captured at the Vlieter Incident, 30 August 1799
  Princess of Orange 74 – ex-Dutch Washington, harbour service 1806, sold 1822.
  Leyden 64 – floating battery 1805, sold 1815
  Texel 64 – ex-Dutch Cerberus, sold 1818

Captured Dutch fourth-rate two-deckers
 Brakel (c. 1784), captured at the Capitulation of Saldanha Bay in 1796, sold 1814
 Tromp (c. 1779), captured at the Capitulation of Saldanha Bay in 1796, sold 1815
 Alkmaar (c. 1783), captured at the Battle of Camperdown (1797), sold 1815
 Broederschap (c. 1769), captured at the Vlieter Incident (1799), renamed Broaderscarp, broken up 1805
 Batavier (c. 1779), captured at the Vlieter Incident (1799), broken up 1823
 Beschermer (c. 1784), captured at the Vlieter Incident (1799), sold 1838
Note the six Dutch ships above were 54-gun ships, so the British Navy as classed them as Fourth rate two-deckers, and not as ships of the line.

Spanish ships
  San Nicolas 80 (1769) – ex-Spanish, captured Battle of Cape St Vincent (1797), prison ship 1798, sold 1814.
  San Josef 110 (1783) – ex-Spanish, captured Battle of Cape St Vincent (1797), training ship by 1837, broken up 1849
  San Antonio 74 (1785) – sold to become French Saint Antoine (1801), captured at the Battle of Algeciras Bay in 1801, prison ship 1807, sold 1828

Captures of the Napoleonic Wars
 French 80-gun ships of Le Tonnant class:
 Brave 80 – ex-French Le Formidable, captured 1805, broken up 1816 
 Alexandre – ex-French Alexandre, captured 1806, sold 1822 
 French 74-gun ships of Le Téméraire class:
 Duquesne 74 (1788) – ex-French Le Duquesne, captured 25 July 1803, stranded 1804, broken up 1805
 Implacable 74 (1800) – ex-French Le Duguay-Trouin, captured 4 November 1805, training ship 1805, scuttled 1949
 Mont Blanc 74 (1791) – ex-French Mont Blanc, captured 4 November 1805, hulk 1811, sold 1819
 Scipion 74 (1801) – ex-French Le Scipion, captured 4 November 1805, broken up 1819
 Brave 74 (1795) – ex-French Le Brave, captured 6 February 1806, foundered 1806
 Maida 74 (1795) – ex-French Le Jupiter, captured 6 February 1806), sold 1814
 Marengo 74 (1795) – ex-French Le Marengo, captured 1806, broken up 1816 
 Abercrombie 74 (1807) – ex-French D'Hautpoul, captured 7 September 1809, sold 1817
 Genoa (ex-French Le Brillant, captured 1814 on stocks) – broken up 1838 
 French 74-gun ship of Le Pluton class:
 Rivoli 74 (1810) – ex-French Le Rivoli, captured 22 February 1812, broken up 1819
 Spanish 74-gun ship of San Juan Nepomuceno class:
 San Juan 74 – ex-Spanish San Juan Nepomuceno, captured 21 October 1805, hulked 1805

Danish ship captured at the Battle of Copenhagen (1801)
 HMS Holstein – renamed Nassau in 1805; sold 1814.

Danish ships captured at the Battle of Copenhagen (1807)
 Christian VIII 80 (?) – harbour service 1809, broken up 1838
 Dannemark 74 (?) – sold 1815
 Norge 74 (?)– sold 1816
 Princess Carolina 74 (?) – sold 1815

List of ships-of-the-line of the Royal Navy (1830–47)
Captain Sir William Symonds served as Surveyor of the Navy from 1832 to 1847.  Captain Symonds was a naval officer and yacht designer, "who had risen to prominence by his success in competitive sailing trials between small warships.  His selection implied a criticism of the dockyard-trained architects of the preceding 200 years". Symonds attempted a revolution in warship design.  His ships were designed to be faster under sail, and have more room for the gunners to work the guns (improving ergonomics).  To achieve this, his ships were larger, and used a different hull form to provide stability without needing large amounts of ballast.  Unfortunately the Surveyor's department was understaffed for the amount of work they were undertaking, and mistakes were made.  Symonds' designs had more stability than was desirable, with the result that they rolled excessively and therefore were poor gun platforms.  Another problem with Symonds' ships was that they were very sensitive to the distribution of weights on board ship, such as the stores carried and consumed on a voyage.

Symonds worked very closely with John Edye, an experienced and well-educated shipwright officer.  Edye was responsible for the details of structure and construction.  The ships that Symonds and Edye designed had far more iron in their structure than the previous generation of ships designed by Seppings.

First rates of 120 guns (three-deckers)
 Royal Albert class (Lang) 3-decker, 120 guns
 Royal Albert 120 (1854) – laid down 1844, converted to screw 1852–54 
 Duke of Wellington class (Surveyors Department) improved Queen, 3-deckers, 120 guns
 Windsor Castle 120 (1852) – laid down 1849, converted to screw 131-guns 1852, renamed Duke of Wellington 
 Marlborough 120 (1855) – laid down 1850, converted to screw 131-guns 1853–55 
 Royal Sovereign 120 (1857) – laid down 1849, converted to screw 1855–57 
 Prince of Wales 120 (1860) – laid down 1848, converted to screw 1856–60

First rates of 110 guns (three-deckers)
 Queen class (Symonds & Edye) 3-decker 110 guns
 Queen 116 (1839) – ex-Royal Frederick, laid down 1833, converted to screw 2-decker 1858–59 
 Victoria 116 (1858) – laid down 1844, renamed Windsor Castle 1855, converted to screw 1857–58 
 Frederick William 116 (1860) – ex-Royal Frederick, laid down 1841, converted to screw 2-decker 1859–60 
 Algiers – ordered 1833, but not begun, cancelled 11 December 1834.
 Royal Sovereign – ordered 1832, probably not begun, cancelled 1838.

Second rates of 90 guns (two-deckers)
 Albion class (Symonds & Edye)
 Albion 90 (1842) – laid down 1839.  A design error led to the main deck in Albion being unusually low. converted to screw 1860-1 
 Aboukir 91 (1848) – laid down 1840, converted to screw 1856–58 
 Exmouth 91 (1854) – laid down 1841, converted to screw 1853–54 
 Saint Jean D'Acre – ordered 1844 but not begun, cancelled 1845 
 Hannibal – ordered 1839, probably not begun, cancelled 1846 
 Princess Royal class (Edye) modified Albion class
 Princess Royal 91 (1853) – laid down 1841, converted to screw 1853 
 Hannibal 91 (1854) – laid down 1848, converted to screw 1854 
 Algiers class (Edye or Committee of Reference) modified Albion class
 Algiers 91 (1854) – laid down 1848, converted to screw 1852–54 
 Caesar class (Committee of Reference) modified Rodney class
 Caesar 91 (1853) – laid down 1848, converted to screw 1852–53

Second rates of 80 guns (two-deckers)
 Vanguard class (Symonds & Edye)
 Vanguard 78 (1835) – laid down 1833, broken up 1875
 Goliath 80 (1842) – laid down 1834, converted to screw 1856–57 
 Superb 80 (1842) – laid down 1838, lent as accommodation ship for Turkish naval crews of ships building on the Thames 1864, by 1866 returned to ordinary reserve, broken up 1869 
 Meeanee 60 (1848) – ex-Madras, laid down 1841, converted to screw 1852–53
 Collingwood 80 (1841) – laid down 1835, converted to screw 1860–61
 Centurion 80 (1844) – laid down 1839, converted to screw 1854–55 
 Mars 80 (1848) – laid down 18395, converted to screw 1855–56 
 Lion 80 (1847) – laid down 1840, converted to screw 1858–59 
 Majestic 80 (1853) – laid down 1841, converted to screw 1852–53 
 Colossus 80 (1848) – laid down 1843, converted to screw 1854–55 
 Irresistible 80 (1859) – laid down 1849, converted to screw 1855–59 
 Modified Vanguard class (Admiralty alteration of Symonds & Edye design)
 Brunswick 80 (1855) – laid down 1847, converted to screw 1854–55
 Orion class (Edye & Watts)
 Orion 80 (1854) – laid down 1850, converted to screw 91-guns 1852–54
 Hood 80 (1859) – laid down 1849, converted to screw 91-guns 1856–59
 Edgar 80 (-) never laid down 
 Sans Pareil class – lines of ex-French Sans Pareil captured in 1795, though structurally different
 Sans Pareil 80 (1851) – laid down 1845, converted to screw 70-guns 1849–51

Third rates of 70 guns (two-deckers)
 Boscawen class (Symonds & Edye)
 Boscawen 70 (1844) – built from frames originally made for another ship, drill ship at Southampton 1862, to the Tyne as a hulk 1874 and renamed Wellesley, burnt and broken up 1914 
 Cumberland 70 (1842) – laid down 1836, sheer hulk at Sheerness 1863, training ship in the Clyde for the Clyde Industrial Training Ship Association 1869, destroyed by fire 1889

List of unarmoured steam ships-of-the-line of the Royal Navy (1847–61)
Ships have been listed by class as in Lambert.

Ships converted to steam ships-of-the-line
 Duke of Wellington class 3-deckers, 131 guns
 Duke of Wellington 131 (1852) – ex-Windsor Castle, laid down 1849, converted to screw 1852, receiving ship Portsmouth 1863, sold 1902 for broken up 
 Marlborough 131 (1855) – laid down 1850, converted to screw 1853–55, receiving ship Portsmouth 1878, renamed Vernon II 1904, sold 1924, capsized off Brighton while on tow to the breakers Oct 1924
 Royal Sovereign 121 (1857) – laid down 1849, converted to screw 1855–57, converted to turret ship 1864, sold for breaking 1885 
 Prince of Wales 121 (1860) – laid down 1848, converted to screw 1856–60, renamed Britannia to replace original ship of that name as training ship for boys in the river Dart 1869, hulked 1909, sold for breaking 1914 
 Royal Albert class (Lang) 3-decker, 121 guns
 Royal Albert 121 (1854) – laid down 1844, converted to screw 1852–54, sold 1883 for broken up 
 Windsor Castle class 3-decker, 102 guns, laid down as Queen class 116 guns
 Windsor Castle 102 (1858) – ex-Victoria, laid down 1844, converted to screw 1857–58, no sea-service, renamed Cambridge and hulked as gunnery training ship Devonport 1869, sold 1908 
 Orion class 2-deckers, 91 guns, laid down as 80 gun ships
 Orion 91 (1854) – broken up 1867
 Hood 91 (1859) – sold 1888/1904
 Edgar 80 (-) – never laid down
 Caesar class 2-decker, 91 guns
 Caesar 91 (1853) – sold 1870
 Algiers class 2-decker, 91 guns, improved Albion class
 Algiers 91 (1854) – sold 1870
 Princess Royal class 2-deckers, 91 guns, laid down as Albion class
 Princess Royal 91 (1853) – sold 1872
 Hannibal 91 (1854) – sold 1904
 Rodney class 2-deckers, 91 guns
 Rodney 91 (1833) – converted to screw 1860, broken up 1882
 Nile 91 (1839) – converted to screw 1854, burnt 1956
 London 91 (1840) – converted to screw 1858, sold 1884
 Nelson class 2-decker, 91 guns, originally Nelson class 3-decker 120 guns
 Nelson 91 (1814) – laid down as 120-gunner. Converted to steam and cut down to 2-decker 1859–60.  Fitted as schoolship for New South Wales 1867. Sold 1898.  Broken up 1928.  No service as sail or steam line-of-battle ship
 Royal George class 2-deckers, 89 guns, originally Caledonia class 3-decker 120 guns
 Prince Regent 89 (1823) – cut down to 92-gun 2-decker 1841–47, converted to screw 1860–61, broken up 1873
 Royal George 89 (1827) – converted to steam 120-gun 3-decker 1852–53, poop and forecastle removed December 1854, making her 102-gun 3-decker, cut down to 89-gun 2-decker 1860, sold 1875
 Saint George class 2-deckers, 89 guns, originally broadened Caledonia class 3-decker 120 guns
 St George 89 (1840) – sold 1883
 Royal William 89 (1833) – burnt 1899
 Neptune 89 (1827) – sold 1875
 Waterloo 120 (1833) – converted 1859, renamed Conqueror 1862, renamed Warspite 1877 and served as a training ship at Greenhithe/Woolwich.  Burnt 1918.
 Trafalgar 91 (1841) – sold 1906
 Albion class 2-deckers, 91 guns, originally Albion class 2-deckers 90 guns
 Albion 91 (1842) – conversion to screw begun 1861, never completed; broken up 1884
 Aboukir 91 (1848) – sold 1878
 Exmouth 91 (1854) – sold 1905
 Queen class 2-deckers, 86 guns, originally Queen class 3-decker 120 guns
 Queen 86 (1839) – converted to screw 2-decker 1858–59, broken up 1871
 Frederick William 86 (1860) – converted to screw 2-decker 1859–60, renamed Worcester 1876 and became training ship at Greenhithe for the Thames Marine Officers Training Society, sold 1948, foundered 1948, raised and broken up 1953 
 Cressy class 2-decker, 80 guns
 Cressy 80 (1853) – sold 1867
 Majestic class 2-deckers, 80 guns, originally Vanguard class 2-deckers 80 guns
 Goliath 80 (1842) – converted to screw 1857, burnt 1875
 Collingwood 80 (1841) – converted to screw 1861, sold 1867
 Centurion 80 (1844) – converted to screw 1855/56, sold 1870
 Mars 80 (1848) – converted to screw 1855, sold 1929
 Lion 80 (1847) – converted to screw 1859, sold 1905
 Majestic 80 (1853) – broken up 1868
 Meeanee 80 (1848) – laid down as Madras 80. Converted to screw 1857, broken up 1906
 Colossus 80 (1848) – converted to screw 1854, sold 1867
 Brunswick 80 (1855) – sold 1867
 Irresistible 80 (1859) – sold 1894
 Bombay class 2-decker, 80 guns, ex-Canopus class
 Bombay 84 (1828) – converted to screw 1861, burnt 1864
 Sans Pareil class 2-decker, 80 guns
 Sans Pareil 80 (1851) – completed as 70-gun screw warship, sold 1867
 Blenheim class 2-deckers, 60 guns blockships, ex-74s
 Ajax 60 (1809) – ex-74, converted to 60-gun screw blockship, 1847, broken up 1864
 Blenheim 60 (1813) – ex-74, converted to 60-gun screw blockship 1847, hulked at Portsmouth, broken up 1865
 Edinburgh 60 (1811) – ex-74, converted to 60-gun screw blockship 1852, sold 1866
 Hogue 60 (1811) – ex-74, converted to 60-gun screw blockship 1848, broken up 1865
 Cornwallis class 2-deckers, 60 guns blockships, ex-74s
 Cornwallis 60 (1813) – ex-74, converted to 60-gun screw blockship 1854–55, hulked as a jetty at Sheerness 1865, renamed Wildfire 1916 as base ship, broken up 1957 
 Hastings 60 (1819) – ex-74, purchased from East India Company in 1819, converted to 60-gun screw blockship 1855, Coastguard 1857, coal hulk 1870, sold 1885 
 Hawke 60 (1820) – ex-74, converted to 60-gun screw blockship 1854–55, broken up 1865
 Pembroke 60 (1812) – ex-74, converted to 60-gun screw blockship 1855, hulked as base ship Chatham 1873, renamed Forte 1890 as receiving hulk, then Pembroke again 1891, sold 1905 
 Russell 60 (1822) – ex-74, converted to 60-gun screw blockship 1854–55, coastguard ship Sheerness 1858, broken up 1865

Wooden-hulled ships built (or at least laid down) as steam ships-of-the-line
 Victoria class, 3-deckers, 121 guns
 Victoria 121 (1859) – sold 1892
 Howe 110 (1860) – renamed Impregnable. sold 1921
 Saint Jean D'Acre class 2-decker, 101 guns
 St Jean d'Acre 101 (1853) – sold 1875
 Conqueror class 2-deckers, 101 guns
 Conqueror 101 (1855) – wrecked 1861
 Donegal 101 (1858) – renamed Vernon 1886, sold 1925
 Duncan class 2-deckers, 101 guns
 Duncan 101 (1859) – sold 1910
 Gibraltar 101 (1860) – renamed Grampian 1888, sold 1899
 Agamemnon class 2-decker, 91 guns
 Agamemnon 91 (1852) – sold 1870
 James Watt class 2-deckers, 91 guns
 James Watt 91 (1853) – sold 1875
 Victor Emanuel 91 (1855) – ex-Repulse. sold 1899
 Edgar 91 (1858) - sold 1904
 Hero 91 (1858) – sold 1871
 Renown class 2-deckers, 91 guns
 Revenge 91 (1859) – broken up 1923
 Renown 91 (1857) – sold 1870
 Atlas 91 (1860) – broken up 1904
 Anson 91 (1860) – broken up 1904
 Defiance class 2-decker, 91 guns
 Defiance 91 (1861) – sold 1931
 Bulwark class 2-deckers, 91 guns
 Bulwark 91 (-) – suspended almost complete 1861, broken up 1873
 Robust 91 (-) – laid down as Duncan class, suspended almost complete 1861, broken up 1872
 Repulse – ordered to be converted to ironclad 1866
 Zealous – ordered to be converted to ironclad 1864
 Royal Alfred – ordered to be converted to ironclad 1861
 Triumph – ordered to be converted to  1861 and completed as Prince Consort
 Caledonia – ordered to be converted to  1861
 Ocean – ordered to be converted to  1861
 Blake  – ordered but never laid down.  Cancelled 1863.
 Kent  – ordered but never laid down.  Cancelled 1863.
 Pitt  – ordered but never laid down.  Cancelled 1863.

List of ironclad warships of the Royal Navy (1860–82)

Sea-going ironclads (1860–82)
  broadside ironclads
 Warrior (1860) – preserved Portsmouth
 Black Prince (1861) – renamed Emerald 1903, renamed Impregnable III 1910, sold for breaking 1923
  broadside ironclads
 Defence (1861)
 Resistance (1861)
  broadside ironclads
 Hector (1862)
 Valiant (1863)
 Achilles (1863) broadside ironclad
  broadside ironclads
 Minotaur (1863)
 Agincourt (1865)
 Northumberland (1866)
  broadside ironclads (converted from Bulwark-class 2-deckers)
 Prince Consort (1862) (ex-Triumph)
 Caledonia (1862)
 Ocean (1862)
 Royal Oak (1862) – broadside ironclad (converted from Bulwark-class 2-decker)
 Royal Alfred (1864) – central-battery ironclad (converted from Bulwark-class 2-decker)
 Research (1863) – central-battery ironclad
 Enterprise (1864) – central-battery ironclad
 Favorite (1864) – central-battery ironclad
 Zealous (1864) – central-battery ironclad (converted from Bulwark-class 2-decker)
 Repulse (1868) – central-battery ironclad (converted from Bulwark-class 2-decker)
  broadside ironclads
 Lord Clyde (1864)
 Lord Warden (1865)
 Pallas (1865) – central-battery ironclad
 Bellerophon (1865) – central-battery ironclad
 Penelope (1867) – central-battery ironclad
 Hercules (1868) – central-battery ironclad – sold for breaking 1932
 Monarch (1868) – masted turret-ship
 Captain class – masted turret-ship
 Captain (1869) – sank 1870
  central-battery ironclads
 Audacious (1869)
 Invincible (1869)
 Iron Duke (1870)
 Vanguard (1870)
  central-battery ironclads
 Swiftsure (1870) – sold for breaking 1908
 Triumph (1870) – sold for breaking 1921
 Sultan (1870) – central-battery ironclad
  – mastless turret-ship
 Devastation (1871) – sold for break up 1908
 Thunderer (1872) – mastless turret-ship, sold for breaking 1909
 Alexandra (1875) – central-battery ironclad, sold for breaking 1908
 Temeraire (1876) – central-battery ironclad with barbettes
 Superb class (intended for Ottoman Empire) – central-battery ironclads
 Superb (1875) – launched as Hamidieh, renamed
 (Ottoman Messudieh)
 Neptune (1874) (ex-Independencia) – masted turret-ship, sold for breaking 1903
 Dreadnought (1875) –  mastless turret-ship, sold for breaking 1908
 Inflexible (1876) – central citadel turret-ship, sold for breaking 1903
  central citadel turret-ships
 Agamemnon (1879) – broken up 1903
 Ajax (1880) – sold for breaking 1904

Coastal service ironclads
 Royal Sovereign (1862) – turret-ship, converted from Duke of Wellington-class 3-decker
 Prince Albert (1864) – turret-ship
  masted turret-ships
 Scorpion (1863)
 Wivern (1863)
  turret-ships
 Cerberus (1868) (Victoria)
 Magdala (1870) (India)
 Abyssinia (1870) (India) – turret-ship
 Glatton (1871) – turret-ship
 Hotspur (1870) – turret-ship
 Rupert (1872) – turret-ship, sold for breaking 1907
  (intended for Ottoman Empire) central battery ships
 Belleisle (1876) – launched as Peki-Shereef, renamed
 Orion (1879) – planned name Boordhi-Zaffer
  turret-ships
 Conqueror (1881) – sold for breaking 1907
 Hero (1885)

See also
 Bibliography of 18th-19th century Royal Naval history

Notes

References
 Chesnau, Roger and Kolesnik, Eugene (Ed.) Conway's All the World's Fighting Ships 1860–1905. Conway Maritime Press, 1979. 
 
 Lambert, Andrew   Battleships in Transition, the Creation of the Steam Battlefleet 1815–1860, published Conway Maritime Press, 1984.  
 Lambert, Andrew   The Last Sailing Battlefleet, Maintaining Naval Mastery 1815–1850, published Conway Maritime Press, 1991.  
 Lavery, Brian, The Ship of the Line Volume I, pub Conway Maritime Press, 1983, 
(Also: *)
 Lyon, David, The Sailing Navy List, All the Ships of the Royal Navy – Built, Purchased and Captured 1688–1860, pub Conway Maritime Press, 1993, 
 Lyon, David and Winfield, Rif, The Sail and Steam Navy List, All the Ships of the Royal Navy 1815–1889, pub Chatham, 2004, 
 Parkes, Oscar   British Battleships, first published Seeley Service & Co, 1957, published United States Naval Institute Press, 1990.  
 Winfield, Rif, British Warships in the Age of Sail: 1603–1714 – Design, Construction, Careers and Fates, pub Seaforth Publishing, Barnsley (2009) .
 Winfield, Rif, British Warships of the Age of Sail: 1714–1792 – Design, Construction, Careers and Fates, pub Seaforth Publishing, Barnsley (2007) .
 Winfield, Rif, British Warships in the Age of Sail: 1793–1817 – Design, Construction, Careers and Fates, pub Chatham Publishing, London (2005) ; (2nd edition) Seaforth Publishing, Barnsley (2008) .

For subsequent capital ships of the Royal Navy, please see List of pre-dreadnought battleships of the Royal Navy and List of dreadnought battleships of the Royal Navy.

Ships of the line
Royal Navy ships of the line
 
Ships of the line of the royal navy